= Family tree of Vietnamese monarchs =

Following is the family tree of Vietnamese monarchs from the autonomous period of the Khúc clan (905–923) to the reign of Bảo Đại (1926–1945), the last emperor of the Nguyễn dynasty. Emperors, kings and lords of each monarch are denoted by different colours with the period of their reigns.

== Timeline ==
							Ming domination				Nam–Bắc triều * Bắc Hà–Nam Hà				French Indochina
Chinese domination	Ngô	Đinh	Early Lê	Lý	Trần	Hồ	Later Trần		Lê	Mạc	Revival Lê		Tây Sơn	Nguyễn		Modern time
											Trịnh lords
											Nguyễn lords
939			1009	1225	1400			1427	1527	1592		1788		1858	1945

== Family tree ==
Colour notes

Khúc clan (906–930)	Dương family (931–937)	Ngô dynasty (939–967)	Kiều family (937–938)
Đinh dynasty (968–980)	Early Lê dynasty (980–1009)	Lý dynasty (1009–1225)	Trần dynasty (1225–1400)
Hồ dynasty(1400–1407)	Later Trần dynasty (1407–1428)	Lê dynasty (1428–1527; 1533–1789)	Mạc dynasty (1527–1677)
Trịnh lords (1545–1787)	Nguyễn lords (1558–1777)	Tây Sơn dynasty (1778–1802)	Nguyễn dynasty (1802–1945)

=== 931–1413 ===
Khúc Thừa Dụ (905–907)
Khúc Hạo (907–917)
Khúc Thừa Mỹ; 917–923 or 917–930	Dương Đình Nghệ; 931–937	Kiều Công Tiễn^{a} 937–938
Queen Dương	Ngô Quyền; 939–944	Dương Tam Kha^{b} 944–950
?
Ngô Xương Ngập; 951–954	Ngô Xương Văn; 950–965	Đinh Tiên Hoàng; 968–979	Dương Vân Nga	Lê Đại Hành; 980–1005
Đinh Phế Đế; 979–980	Lê Thị Phất Ngân	Lý Thái Tổ; 1010–1028	Lê Trung Tông; 1005	Lê Long Đĩnh; 1005–1009
Lý Thái Tông; 1028–1054
Lý Thánh Tông; 1054–1072
Sùng Hiền hầu	Lý Nhân Tông; 1072–1127
Lý Thần Tông; 1128–1138
Lý Anh Tông; 1138–1175
Trần Lý	Lý Cao Tông; 1176–1210
Trần Thừa; 1184–1234	Lý Huệ Tông; 1211–1224	Trần Thị Dung	Trần Thủ Độ
Thuận Thiên	Trần Thái Tông; 1225–1258	Lý Chiêu Hoàng; 1224–1225
Trần Thánh Tông; 1258–1278
Trần Nhân Tông; 1279–1293
Trần Anh Tông; 1293–1314
Trần Minh Tông; 1314–1329
Hồ Quý Ly; 1400	Princess; Huy Ninh	Trần Nghệ Tông; 1370–1372	Trần Dụ Tông; 1341–1369	Trần Hiến Tông; 1329–1341	Trần Duệ Tông; 1372–1377	Prince Cung Túc
Hồ Hán Thương; 1401–1407	Princess; Thánh Ngâu	Trần Thuận Tông; 1388–1398	Prince; Trần Ngạc	Giản Định Đế; 1407–1409	Trần Phế Đế; 1377–1388	Dương Nhật Lễ^{c} 1369–1370
Trần Thiếu Đế; 1398–1400	Trùng Quang Đế; 1409–1413	Trần Cảo; 1426–1428

=== 1428–1945 ===
Lê Khoang
Lê Trừ	Lê Thái Tổ; 1428–1433
Lê Khang	Lê Thái Tông; 1433–1442
Lê Thờ	Lê Nhân Tông; 1442–1459	Lê Thánh Tông; 1460–1497	Lê Nghi Dân; 1459–1460
Lê Duy Thiệu	Lê Hiến Tông; 1497–1504	Lê Tân
Lê Duy Khoáng	Lê Túc Tông; 1504	Lê Uy Mục; 1505–1509	Lê Doanh	Lê Sùng	Lê Tương Dực; 1510–1516	Mạc Thái Tổ; 1527–1529
Lê Anh Tông^{d} 1556–1573	Nguyễn Kim	Lê Quang Trị; 1516	Lê Cung Hoàng; 1522–1527	Lê Chiêu Tông; 1516–1522	Mạc Thái Tông; 1530–1540
Lê Thế Tông; 1573–1599	Nguyễn Hoàng; 1600–1613	Trịnh Kiểm; 1545–1570	Nguyễn Thị; Ngọc Bảo	Lê Trang Tông; 1533–1548	Mạc Hiến Tông; 1541–1546
Lê Kính Tông; 1600–1619	Nguyễn; Phúc Nguyên; 1613–1635	Trịnh Cối; 1570	Trịnh Tùng; 1570–1623	Lê Trung Tông; 1548–1556	Mạc Tuyên; Tông; 1546–1561
Lê Thần Tông^{e} 1619–1643; 1649–1662	Nguyễn; Phúc Lan; 1635–1648	Trịnh Tráng; 1623–1652	Mạc Mậu Hợp; 1562–1592
Nguyễn Phúc Tần; 1648–1687	Trịnh Tạc; 1653–1682	Mạc Toàn; 1592
Lê Chân Tông; 1643–1649	Lê Huyền Tông; 1663–1671	Lê Gia Tông; 1672–1675	Lê Hi Tông; 1676–1704	Nguyễn Phúc Thái; 1687–1691	Trịnh Căn; 1682–1709
Lê Dụ Tông; 1705–1728	Nguyễn Phúc Chu; 1691–1725	Trịnh Vịnh
Lê Duy Phường; 1729–1732	Lê Thuần Tông; 1732–1735	Lê Ý Tông; 1735–1740	Nguyễn Phúc Trú; 1725–1738	Trịnh Bính
Nguyễn; Phúc Khoát; 1738–1765	Trịnh Cương^{f} 1709–1729
Nguyễn; Phi Phúc	Lê Hiển Tông; 1740–1786	Nguyễn; Phúc Thuần; 1765–1777	Nguyễn; Phúc Luân	Trịnh Giang; 1729–1740	Trịnh Doanh; 1740–1767
Nguyễn Nhạc; 1778–1788	Nguyễn Huệ; 1788–1793	Lê Ngọc Hân	Lê Duy Vĩ	Lê Ngọc Bình	Gia Long^{g} 1781–1802; 1802–1819	Trịnh Bồng; 1786–1787	Trịnh Sâm; 1767–1782
Nguyễn; Quang Toản; 1792–1802	Lê Chiêu Thống; 1787–1789	Minh Mạng; 1820–1840	Trịnh Khải; 1782–1786	Trịnh Cán; 1782
Thiệu Trị; 1841–1847
Tự Đức; 1848–1883	Hiệp Hòa; 1883	Thụy; Thái Vương	Nguyễn Phúc; Hồng Cai
Dục Đức; 1883	Đồng Khánh; 1885–1888	Hàm Nghi; 1884–1885	Kiến Phúc; 1883–1884
Thành Thái; 1889–1907	Khải Định; 1916–1925
Duy Tân; 1907–1916	Bảo Đại; 1926–1945

=== Notes ===
- ^a Kiều Công Tiễn was only adopted son of Dương Đình Nghệ.
- ^b Although being a king of the Ngô dynasty, Dương Tam Kha came from the Dương family as he is Dương Đình Nghệ's son.
- ^c Dương Nhật Lễ was only adopted son of Prince Cung Túc, so he did not bear the family name Trần like other emperors of the Trần dynasty.
- ^d The second elder brother of Lê Thái Tổ was Grand Duke Lam Lê Trừ whose son was Grand Duke Quỳ Lê Khang. Lê Khang was the great-great-grandfather of the emperor Lê Anh Tông. Because Lê Trung Tông died without any son, Lê Anh Tông was chosen for the throne.
- ^e Lê Thần Tông held the throne from 1619 to 1643 and again from 1649 to 1662 in replacing his son Lê Chân Tông who died soon.
- ^f Normally the persons in two successive boxes are connected by parental relation, however in this case, Trịnh Cương was not son, but great-grandson of Trịnh Căn. Since Trịnh Cương's father and grandfather both died before the death of Trịnh Căn, Trịnh Cương was chosen the successor of the Trịnh Lord.
- ^g Gia Long held the position Nguyễn Lord from 1781 to 1802, afterward he became the first emperor of the Nguyễn dynasty from 1802 to 1819.

== See also ==
Family tree of Vietnamese monarchs
Overall	Early independence	Lý Dynasty	Trần dynasty	Lê dynasty	Trịnh lords and Mạc dynasty	Nguyễn lords and dynasty
