= Empress Dao =

Empress Dao may refer to:

- Empress Yujiulü (525–540), wife of Emperor Wen of Western Wei, posthumously known as Empress Dao
- Empress Nhu Thuận (died 1775), wife of Lê Thuần Tông, surnamed Đào
