= Trịnh lords =

Noble feudal Vietnamese clan

Coordinates: 16°28′N 107°36′E

Trịnh lords (1545–1787) Chúa Trịnh (主鄭) Trịnh Vương (鄭王) (1599–1787)
- 1545–1787
- The seal "Tĩnh Đô vương tỷ" (靖都王璽) of lord Trịnh Sâm.

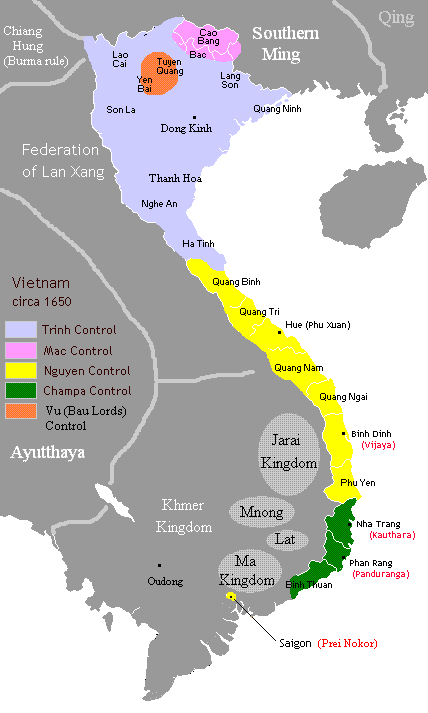
- Map of Vietnam circa 1650 Lê dynasty under Trịnh's control Nguyễn Mạc as rump state Kingdom of Champa.
- Status: Lordship and de jure fief within Lê dynasty of Đại Việt
- Capital: Đông Kinh
- Common languages: Vietnamese
- Religion: Neo-Confucianism, Buddhism, Taoism, Vietnamese folk religion
- Government: Feudal dynastic hereditary military government
- Emperor (Hoàng đế)
  - 1533–1548: Lê Trang Tông (first)
  - 1786–1788: Lê Chiêu Thống (last)
- Duke/King
  - 1545–1570: Trịnh Kiểm (first)
  - 1572–1623: Trịnh Tùng (as king in 1599)
  - 1786–1787: Trịnh Bồng (last)
- History
  - Established: 1545
  - Disestablished: 1787
- Currency: Copper-alloy and zinc cash coins
| Preceded by | Succeeded by |
| Revival Lê dynasty; Mạc dynasty | Tây Sơn dynasty |

The Trịnh lords (Vietnamese: Chúa Trịnh; Chữ Hán: 主鄭; 1545–1787), formally titled as Viceroy of Trịnh (Vietnamese: Trịnh Vương; chữ Hán: 鄭王), also known as the House of Trịnh or the Trịnh clan (Trịnh thị; 鄭氏), were a feudal noble clan that ruled Đàng Ngoài (known by the exonym Tonkin) during the Revival Lê dynasty. The Trịnh lords were de jure subordinates of the Lê dynasty emperors but were in actuality the de facto rulers of northern Vietnam.

The Trịnh clan and their rivals, the Nguyễn clan, were called "Chúa" (主, Lord) by their subjects and controlled northern and southern Vietnam respectively, leaving the Later Lê emperors as rulers in name only. The Trịnh clan produced 12 lords who dominated the royal court of the Later Lê dynasty and ruled northern Vietnam for more than two centuries.

== Background ==
=== Origin ===
The founder of the clan was Trịnh Kiểm, who was born in what is now Vĩnh Lộc commune, Thanh Hóa province. Trịnh Kiểm came from a poor background and often stole chickens from his neighbors because chicken was his mother's favorite food. When his neighbors found out, they became angry. One day, when Trịnh Kiểm left home, his neighbors abducted his mother and threw her down an abyss. Trịnh Kiểm returned home and panicked due to her disappearance. When he found his mother's body, it was infested with maggots. After her death, he joined the Lê loyalist army led by Nguyễn Kim. Because of Trịnh Kiểm's talent, he was married to Nguyễn Kim's daughter Ngọc Bảo. In 1539, Trịnh Kiểm was promoted to general and received the title of Duke of Dực (Dực quận công). In 1545, after the assassination of Nguyễn Kim, Trịnh Kiểm replaced his father-in-law as leader of the Lê dynasty's military and royal court.

=== Government exiled to Lan Xang ===
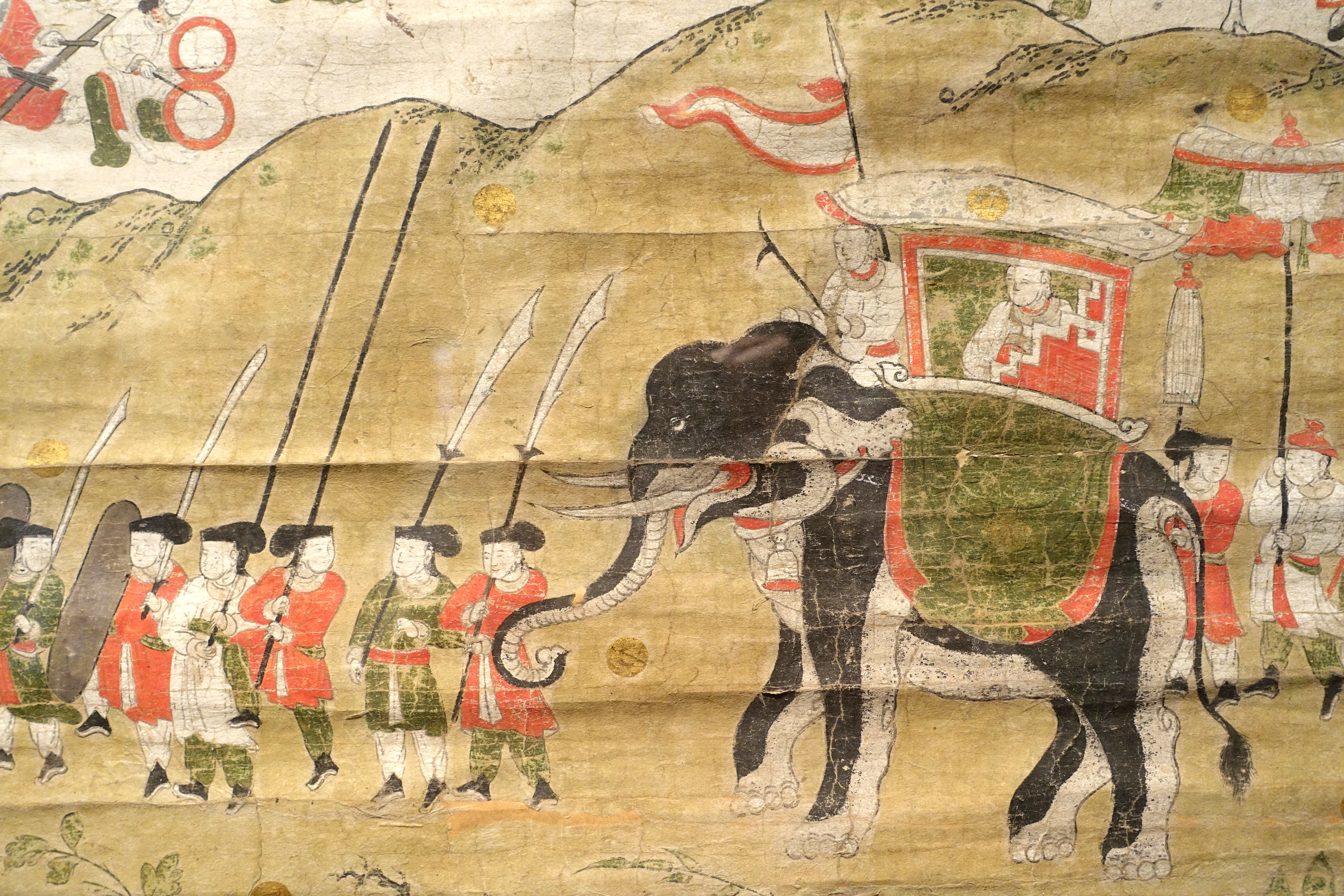
Army of the Trinh lords, late 18th century

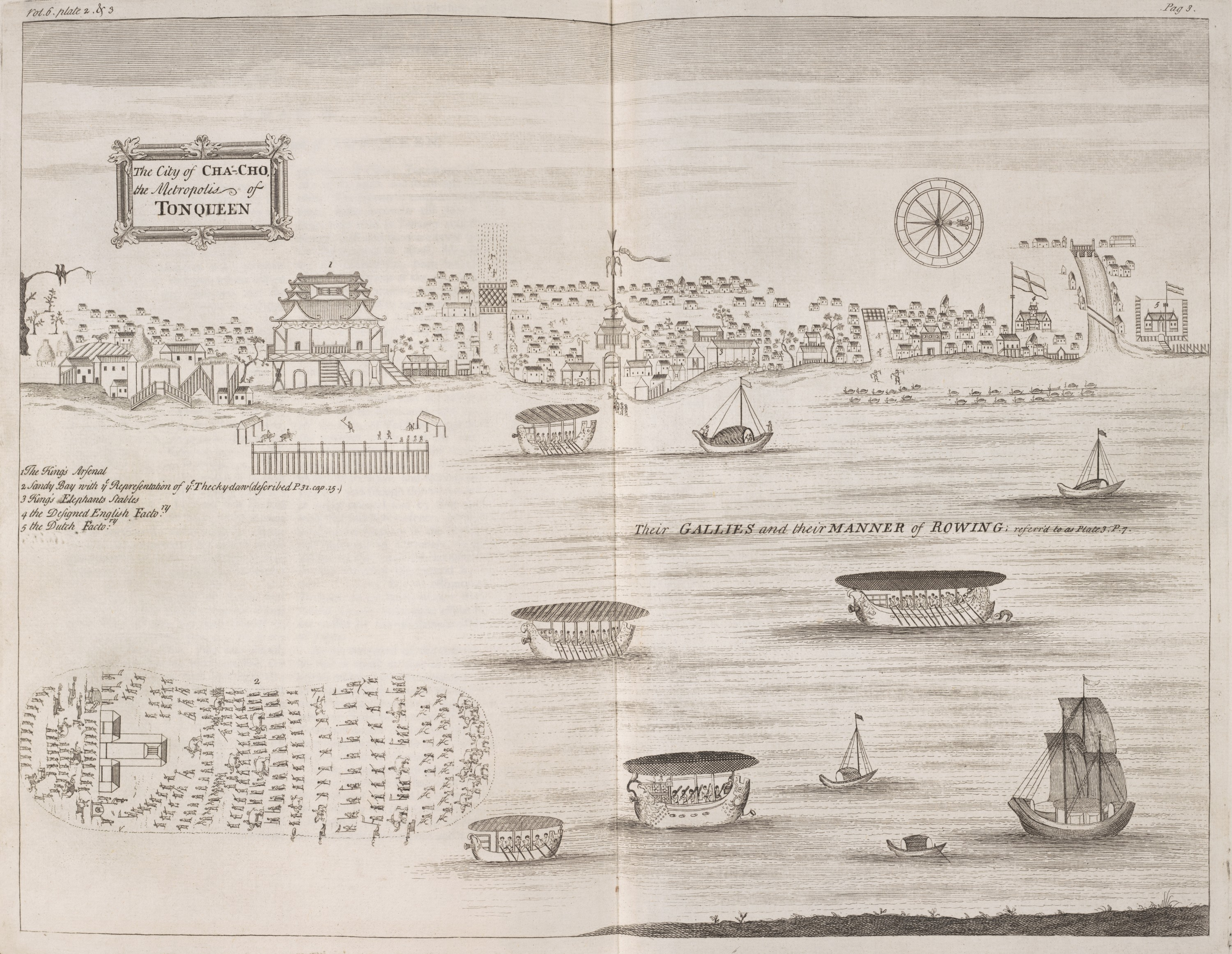
The painting of Đông Kinh (Hanoi) from the Red River in 1685 by Samuel Baron, representative of English East India Company in which depicted the residence of Trịnh lord (The King's Arsenal) labeled as number 1 (Vietnamese: Vương Phủ; chữ Hán: 王府).

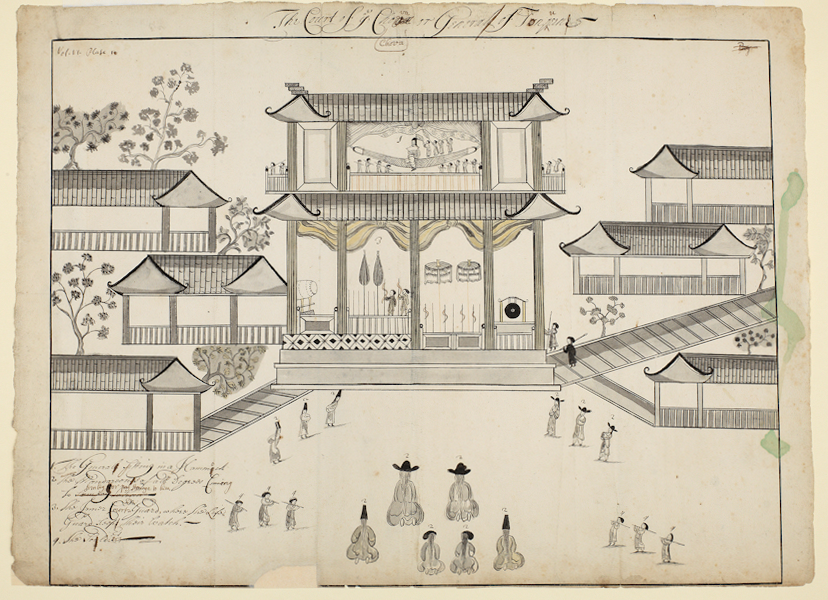
the headquarter of Trịnh lords (Vietnamese: Vương Phủ; chữ Hán: 王府) in Dong Kinh (Hanoi).

After the death of emperor Lê Hiến Tông in 1504, Lê dynasty began to decline followed by some peasant rebellions due to adversities and corruption in central and regional government that led to rising social unrest and grievances of civilians. In 1527, Mạc Đăng Dung, a courtier of government began to seize control of imperial court and emperor gradually and overthrew emperor Lê Cung Hoàng, and established the Mạc dynasty. In 1533, the general and Lê royalist Nguyễn Kim revolted against the Mạc dynasty in Thanh Hóa and restored the Lê dynasty back after searching the Lê dynasty's surviving descendant called prince '"Lê Ninh"', who was a son of emperor Lê Chiêu Tông and enthroned him as emperor Lê Trang Tông during exile at Xam Neua, a territory of Kingdom of Lan Xang. After several years of civil war, most of the southern provinces of Đại Việt was recaptured by restored Lê dynasty, but not until 1592, the imperial capital city Đông Kinh was recaptured and an imperial court moved back to there. Tây Đô was founded as the temporary capital and it marked the beginning of Northern and Southern dynasties from 1533 last until 1677 when Mạc dynasty was defeated by alliance of Southern dynasty.

=== Lê emperor as a figurehead ===
In 1539 the armies of Nguyễn Kim and Trịnh Kiểm returned to Đại Việt, captured Thanh Hóa province, followed by more southern province in later years and installed prince Lê Ninh as the emperor Lê Trang Tông. War raged with the Nguyễn–Trịnh army on one side and the Mạc on the other, until an official Ming delegation determined that Mạc Đăng Dung's usurpation of power was not legitimate. In 1537, a large Ming army was sent to the border to threaten Mạc emperor to return the authority back to Lê emperor. Although Mạc Đăng Dung managed to negotiate this issue with the Ming to control northern part of Đại Việt, he was forced to recognize the Lê emperor's legitimacy over the southern part of realm. However, the war was continued because the Nguyễn–Trịnh alliance refused to recognize Mạc's authority over the northern region. Mạc Đăng Dung died in 1541 and was succeeded by his son.

Pan Dinggui, a Chinese man shipwrecked in Vietnam in 1688, said in his book Annan Ji You that the Trịnh clan restored the Lê dynasty to power after Vietnam was struck by disease, thunder and winds when the Lê ruler was dethroned, and they initially could not find Lê and Trần dynasty royals to restore to the throne. Pan also said that only the Lê ruler was met by official diplomats from the Qing, not the Trịnh lord.

== Trịnh military government ==
=== Death of Nguyễn Kim ===
Despite the fact that the Mạc dynasty remained at large in the north, Trịnh Kiểm turned to eliminating the Nguyễn lords' power. Although the Lê dynasty was restored in 1533 with Lê Trang Tông as emperor, Nguyễn Kim was head of government and wielded real authority in the nation. Dương Chấp Nhất, the Mạc-appointed mandarin governing Tây Đô fortress in Thanh Hoa province, decided to surrender to Lê authorities when Nguyễn Kim recaptured the province in 1543.

After seizing Tây Đô citadel and attacking Ninh Bình, on 20/5/1545, Dương Chấp Nhất invited Kim to visit his military camp. Dương Chấp Nhất treated Kim to watermelon. After returning for from the party, Kim felt ill and died the same day. Dương Chấp Nhất later again pledged allegiance to the Mạc dynasty.

The government fell into chaos after Kim's death. The successor as the head of government was Kim's eldest son, Nguyễn Uông. However, Uông was secretly assassinated by his brother-in-law Trịnh Kiểm, who later took control of the imperial government.

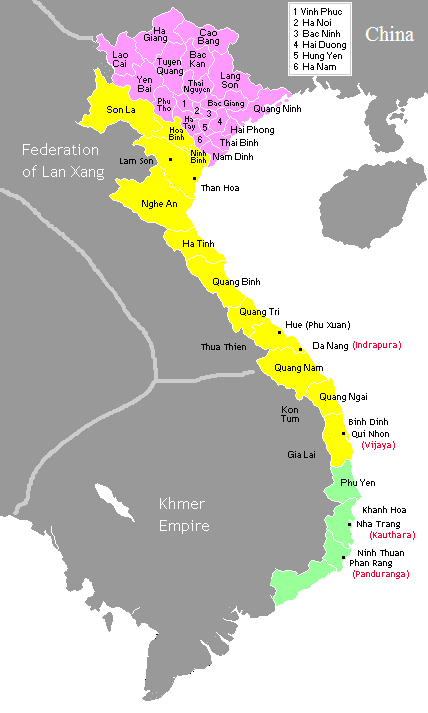
Vietnam circa 1540, showing the Mạc in control of the north (pink) while the Nguyễn-Trịnh alliance controls the south (yellow). Champa (green) was a vassal state

=== Usurpation conspiracy ===
In 1556, Emperor Lê Trung Tông died without an heir. Trịnh Kiểm wanted to seize the throne, but worried about public opinion. He sought advice from the former mandarin Nguyễn Bỉnh Khiêm, who was living in seclusion. Nguyễn Bỉnh Khiêm advised Trịnh Kiểm not to take the Lê dynasty's throne, although the Lê dynasty was just a puppet. Trịnh Kiểm decided to put Lê Duy Bang on the throne, who was a 6th-generation descendant of Lê Trừ, the older brother of emperor Lê Thái Tổ. Lê Duy Bang took the throne with the title Lê Anh Tông while the Trịnh lords continued to control the government with the emperor as figurehead.

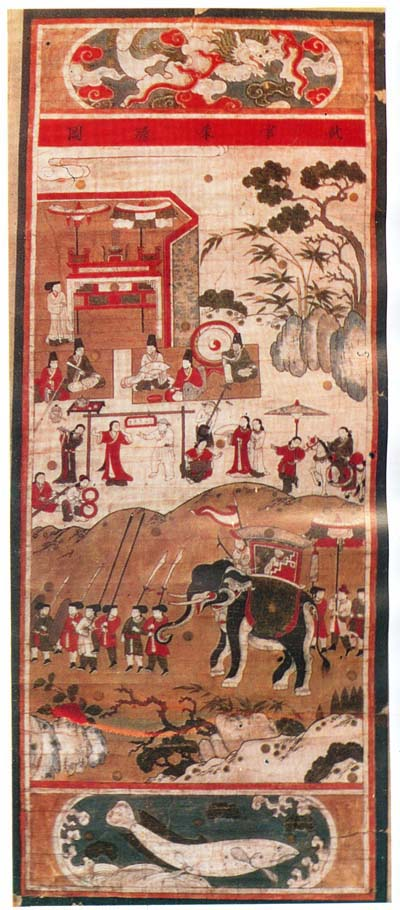
Trịnh lord's villa tea party and troop parade

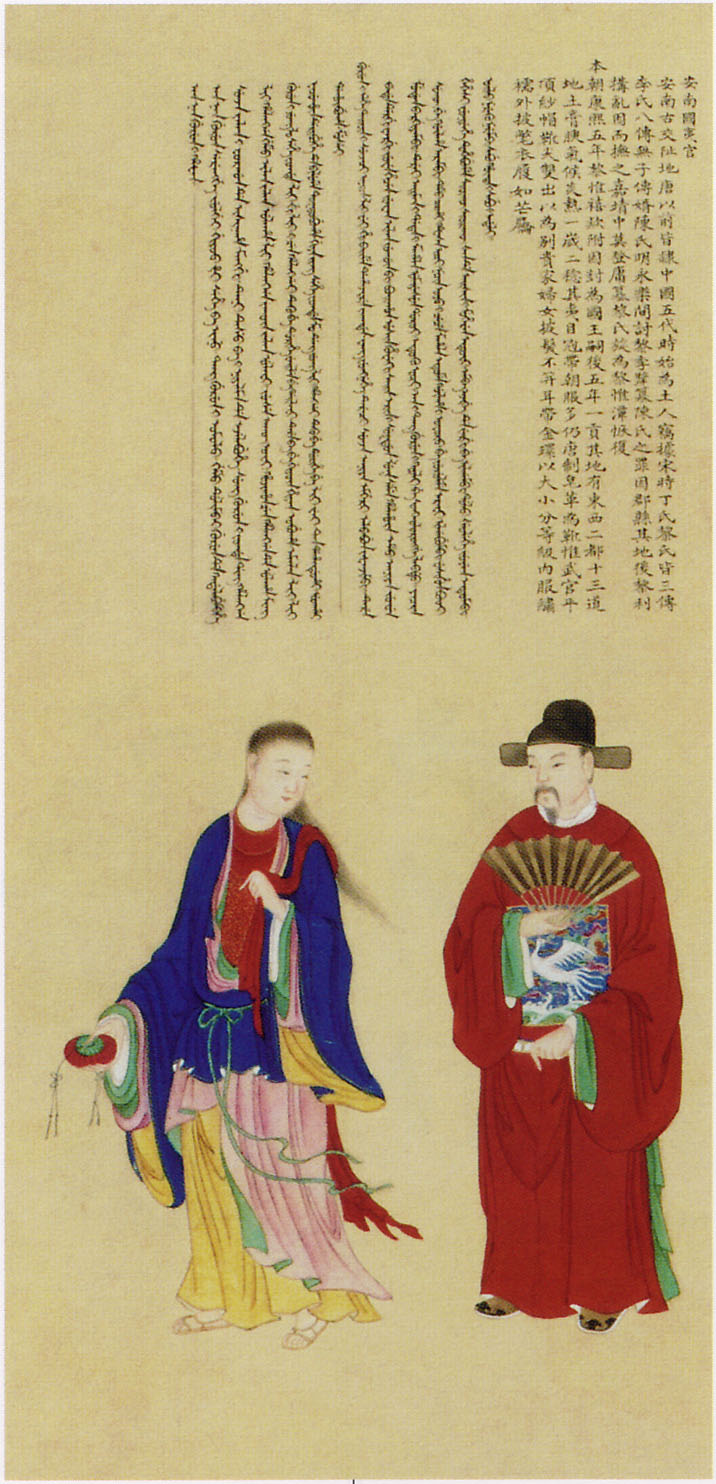
Court dress of mandarins and ladies under Lê - Trịnh government.

=== Legitimacy struggle ===
In 1570, Trịnh Kiểm died and a power struggle erupted between his sons Trịnh Cối and Trịnh Tùng. Simultaneously, the Mạc dynasty army attacked the Lê dynasty from the north and Trịnh Cối surrendered to the Mạc dynasty. The emperor Lê Anh Tông supported Trịnh Cối as the next Trịnh lord and co-operated with him to defeat Trịnh Tùng. Trịnh Tùng found out about this conspiracy, forcing Emperor Lê Anh Tông and his four sons to flee. Later, Trịnh Tùng enthroned Emperor Lê Anh Tông's youngest son, prince Đàm, with title Lê Thế Tông. After that, Trịnh Tùng searched for, captured, and murdered Emperor Lê Anh Tông.

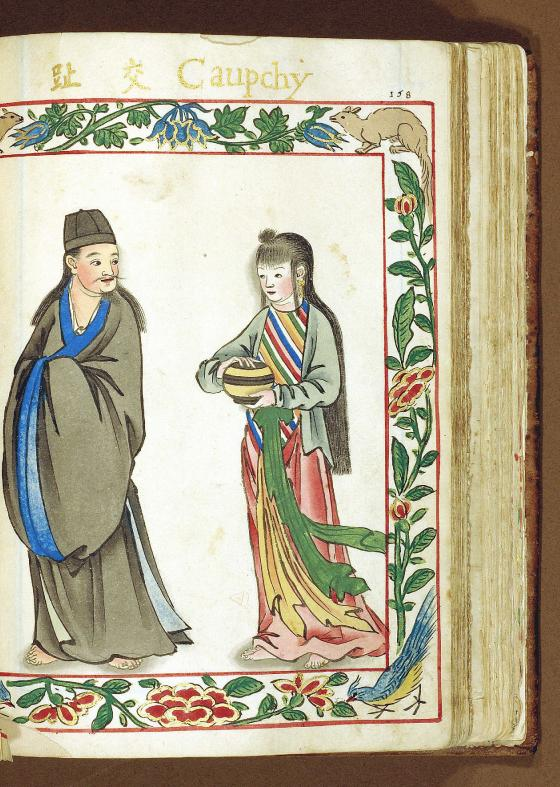
Northern Vietnamese nobleman and wife from Hải Môn harbor (Đàng Ngoài) in 1595.

Two women and a child in Tonkin around the 1700s.

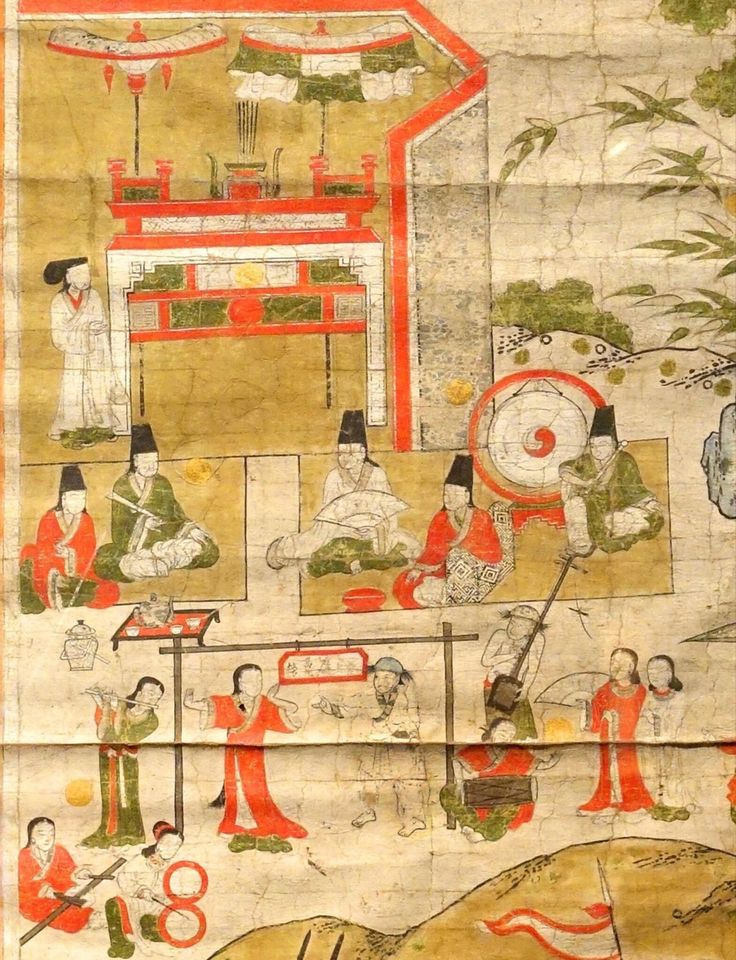
Noble partying in 18th century

== Trịnh–Nguyễn alliance against the Mạc dynasty ==
Both Trịnh and Nguyễn declared that the Lê dynasty was the legitimate government of Đại Việt. Nguyễn Hoàng became increasingly secure in his rule over the southern province and increasingly independent. While he cooperated with the Trịnh against the Mạc, he ruled the frontier lands. With the conquest of the north, the independence of the Nguyễn was less and less tolerable to the Trịnh. In 1600, with the ascension of emperor Lê Kính Tông, Hoàng broke relations with the Trịnh-dominated court, although he continued to acknowledge the Lê emperor. Matters continued like this until Hoàng's death in 1613. The historical victory of the Trịnh over the Mạc was a common theme in public Vietnamese theaters.

== The Trịnh–Nguyễn War ==
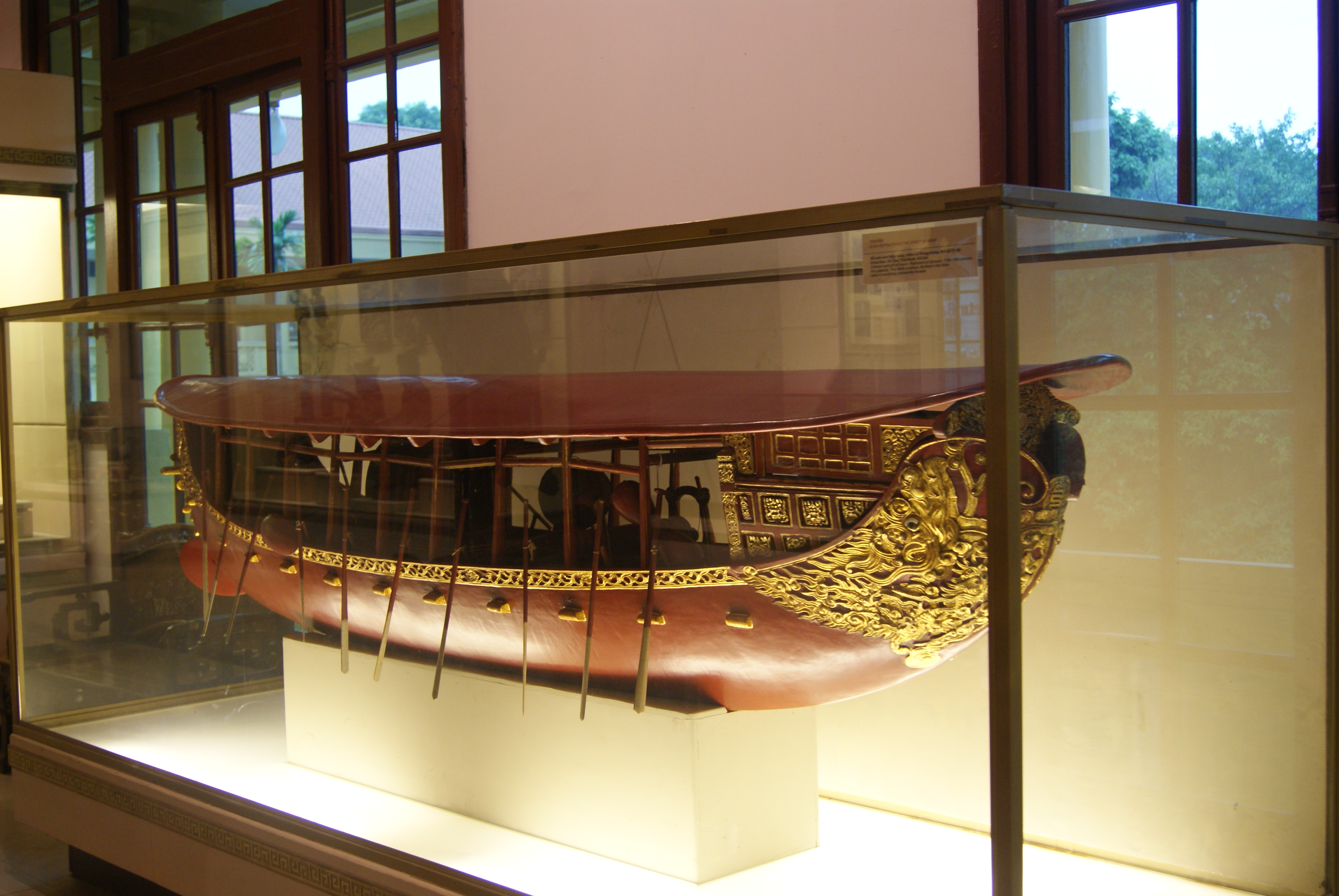
Model of a naval battleship (Mông Đồng) during the Trịnh era in 17th century

In 1620, after the enthronement of another figurehead Lê emperor (Lê Thần Tông), the new Nguyễn leader, Nguyễn Phúc Nguyên, refused to send tax money to the court in Đông Đô to protest the tyranny of the Trịnh lords. In 1623, Trịnh Tung died and was succeeded by oldest son Trịnh Tráng. After five years of increasingly hostile talks, fighting broke out between the Trịnh and the Nguyễn in 1627. While the Trịnh ruled over much more populous territory, the Nguyễn had several advantages.

First, they initially were on the defensive and rarely launched operations into the north. Second, the Nguyễn were able to take advantage of their contacts with Europeans, specifically the Portuguese, to produce advanced cannons with the help of European engineers. Third, the geography favored them, as the flat land suitable for large, organized armies was narrow at the border between the Nguyễn lands and the Trinh territories – mountains reach nearly to the sea. After the first offensive was beaten off after four months, the Nguyễn built two massive, fortified lines that stretched a few miles from the sea to the hills. These walls were built north of Huế (between the Nhật Lệ River and the Sông Hương River). The walls were about 20 feet tall and seven miles long. The Nguyễn defended these lines against numerous Trịnh offensives that lasted (off and on) from 1631 till 1673, when Trịnh Tạc concluded a peace treaty with Nguyễn Phúc Tần, dividing Vietnam between the two families. This division continued for the next 100 years.

== Peace ==
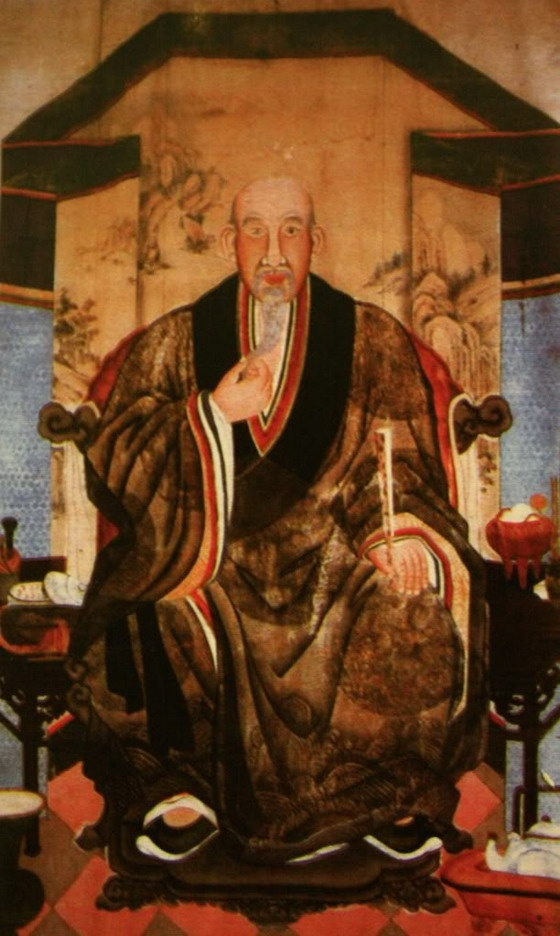
Silk painting of Trịnh Đình Kiên (1715–1786) in 18th century, exhibited in Vietnam National Museum of Fine Arts.

The Trịnh lords ruled reasonably well, maintaining the fiction that the Lê monarch was the emperor. However, they selected and replaced the emperor as they saw fit, having the hereditary right to appoint many top government officials. Unlike the Nguyễn lords, who engaged in frequent wars with the Khmer Empire and Siam, the Trịnh lords maintained relatively peaceable relations with neighboring states. In 1694, they got involved in a war in Laos, which turned into a multi-sided war with Laotian factions as well as the Siamese army. A decade later, Laos had settled into an uneasy peace with three new Lao kingdoms paying tribute to both Vietnam and Siam. Trịnh Căn and Trịnh Cương made many reforms, but these reforms made the government more powerful and more of a burden to the people, which increased their dislike of the government. During the wasteful and inept rule of Trịnh Giang, peasant revolts became more frequent. The key problem was a lack of land to farm, though Giang made the situation worse by his actions. The reign of successor Trịnh Doanh was preoccupied with putting down peasant revolts and wiping out armed gangs that terrorized the countryside.

The Dutch East India Company ceased doing business with the Trịnh lords in 1700.

The Trịnh lords started employing eunuchs extensively in the Đàng Ngoài region of the northern Red River delta area of Vietnam as military leaders. Trịnh-ruled northern Vietnam used its eunuchs in the military and civilian bureaucracy. Many Buddhist temples had money and land donated by eunuchs who had gained wealth and influence. Field army units, secret police, customs duty taxes, finance, land deeds and military registers and tax harvesting in son Nam province (Binh phien) as well as the position of Thanh Hóa military governor were delegated to eunuchs. The supervisor services, military, civil service and court all had eunuchs appointed to work in them and they were faithful followers of the Trịnh lords and a check on the power of civil and military officials. Eunuchs were employed as building project supervisors and provincial governors by Trịnh Cương.

== Tây Sơn Revolt and Southern Conquest ==
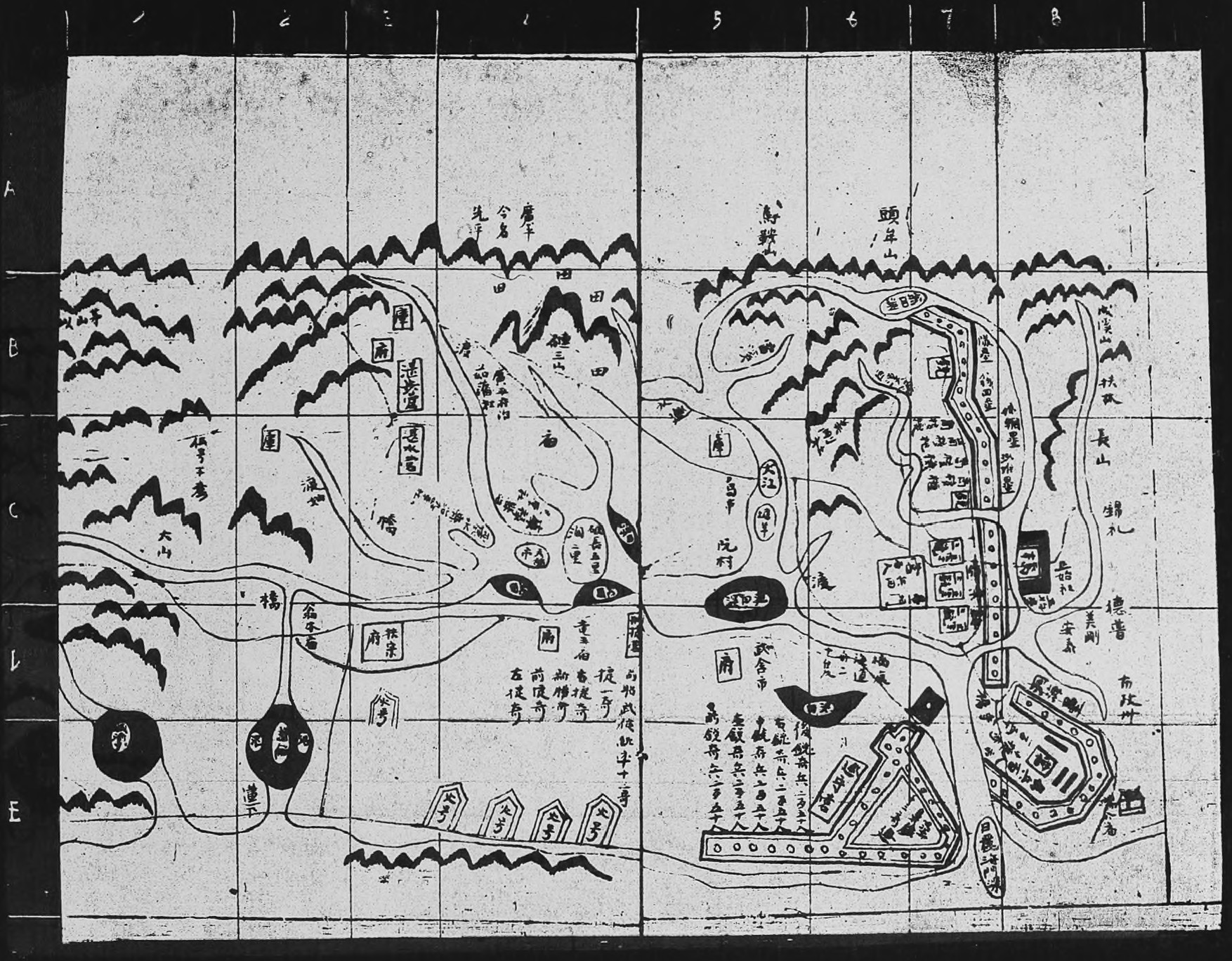
A map in Maps for the Pacification of the South in year Giáp Ngọ (1774), drawn by Bùi Thế Đạt, the governor of Nghệ An.

The long peace came to an end with the Tây Sơn revolt in the south against Trương Phúc Loan, the regent of the Nguyễn lord Nguyễn Phúc Thuần (1765–1777). Trịnh lord Trịnh Sâm saw the Tây Sơn rebellion as a chance to end Nguyễn rule over the south. Inner struggle among the Nguyễn had put a 12-year-old boy in power. The real ruler was corrupt regent Trương Phúc Loan. Using the popular rule of the regent as an excuse for intervention, in 1774, the hundred-year truce was ended and the Trịnh army led by Hoàng Ngũ Phúc attacked.

Trịnh Sâm's army did what no previous Trịnh army had done and conquered the Nguyễn capital, Phú Xuân (modern-day Huế), in early 1775. The Trịnh army advanced south, defeated the Tây Sơn and forced them to surrender. In the middle of 1775, the Trịnh army, include Hoàng Ngũ Phúc, were hit by a plague. The plagued forced them to withdraw and left the rest of the south to the Tây Sơn.

The Tây Sơn army conquered the rest of the Nguyễn lands. The Nguyễn lords retreated to Saigon but lost the city in 1776; the Nguyễn lords were nearly wiped out. Tây Sơn's leader Nguyễn Nhạc declared himself king in 1778.

== End of the Trịnh Viceroy ==
Trịnh Tông, the eldest son of Trịnh Sâm, feared that power would fall to his younger brother Trịnh Cán, who was favored by his father. In 1780, Trịnh Sâm became seriously ill, and Trịnh Tông used this to stage a coup d'état. The plan was discovered, many high-ranking mandarins on Trịnh Tông's side were purged, Tông himself was imprisoned.

In 1782, Trịnh Sâm died and passed power to Trịnh Cán. However, Cán was five years old at the time; the real ruler was Hoàng Ngũ Phúc's adopted son Hoàng Đình Bảo, who was appointed by Sâm as Cán's assistant. A few weeks after Cán was crowned, Trịnh Tông conspired with the Three Prefectures Army (Vietnamese: Tam phủ quân, chữ Hán: 三府軍) to kill Hoàng Đình Bảo and overthrow Trịnh Cán. However, because Tông was indebted to the army, he could not control it. The army then released Lê Duy Kì, son of prince Lê Duy Vĩ who was killed by Trịnh Sâm in 1771, and forced Lê Hiển Tông to appoint Kì as the successor.

After Hoàng Đình Bảo's death, his subordinate in Nghệ An province Nguyễn Hữu Chỉnh defected to Tây Sơn. He was welcomed by the king and became an army commander. In summer 1786, Nguyễn Nhạc, who wanted to reclaim the land of the Nguyễn lords taken by the Trịnh in 1775, ordered his brother Nguyễn Huệ and Nguyễn Hữu Chỉnh to attack Trịnh lords, but warned them not to advance further north. After taking Phú Xuân, Nguyễn Hữu Chỉnh convinced Nguyễn Huệ to overthrow Trịnh lords under the banner "Destroy the Trịnh and Aid the Lê (Vietnamese: Diệt Trịnh phù Lê, chữ Hán: 滅鄭扶黎) that would help them gain support from northern people. The Trịnh and Three Prefectures armiews were quickly defeated. Trịnh Tông committed suicide. Emperor Cảnh Hưng died of old age shortly after and passed the throne to Lê Duy Kì (emperor Chiêu Thống).

Nguyễn Nhạc, after having heard of Nguyễn Huệ's insubordination, hastily marched to Thăng Long and ordered all Tây Sơn troops to withdraw. They intentionally left Nguyễn Hữu Chỉnh behind. Chỉnh chased them and then stayed in his hometown in Nghệ An.

The Tây Sơn's invasion and sudden withdrawal caused a power vacuum in the North. Trịnh Sâm's younger brother Trịnh Lệ with the support of Dương Trọng Tế marched into Thăng Long and forced Chiêu Thống to grant him the title Viceroy, which would make him a Trịnh lord. Emperor Chiêu Thống did not want to reinstall Trịnh lords and rejected Lệ's request. At the same time, Trịnh Bồng, son of Trịnh Giang, marched into Thăng Long. Dương Trọng Tế thought Trịnh Lệ was unpopular and defected to Bồng's side, helping him defeat Trịnh Lệ. Generals Hoàng Phùng Cơ and Đinh Tích Nhưỡng also joined Bồng's faction and pressured Chiêu Thống to grant him the title prince, to which the emperor reluctantly agreed. He then sent a request to Nguyễn Hữu Chỉnh, who had raised a considerable army, to aid the emperor once again. Nguyễn Hữu Chỉnh obeyed and marched north, where he defeated Trịnh army in Thanh Hoa Province. Trịnh Bồng heard the news and withdrew to Gia Lâm District with Dương Trọng Tế, Đinh Tích Nhưỡng and Hoàng Phùng Cơ withdrew to Hải Dương and Sơn Tây respectively. Chiêu Thống set Trịnh's palace on fire.

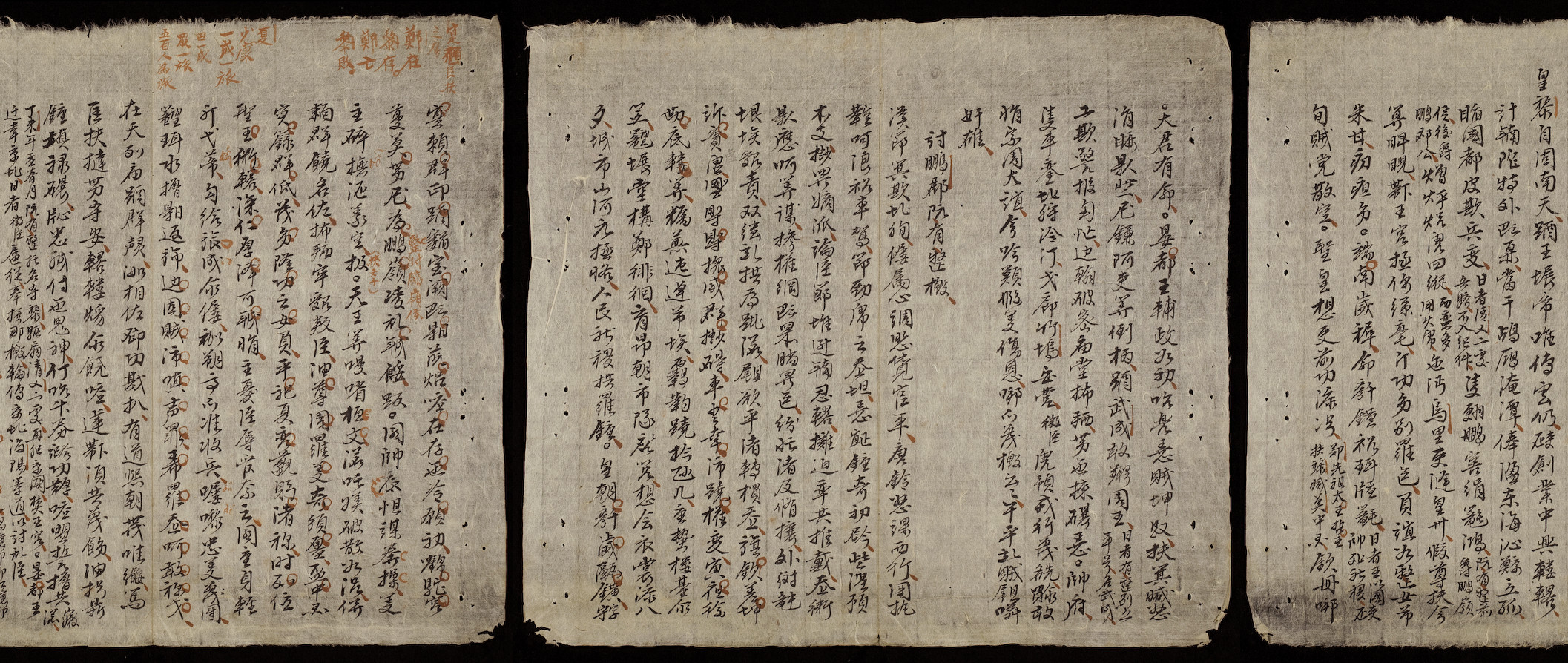
Call to punish Nguyễn Hữu Chỉnh, the [Duke of] Bằng commandery by Lê Huy Dao, one of Trịnh Bồng's followers

In the next months, Nguyễn Hữu Chỉnh carried campaigned against Bồng. He captured and executed Dương Trọng Tế and Hoàng Phùng Cơ. Trịnh Bồng took refuge at Đinh Tích Nhưỡng's camp. Nguyễn Hữu Chỉnh organized a large assault and defeated Bồng in fall 1787. Đinh Tích Nhưỡng and Bồng ran away, officially ending over 200 of Trịnh rule.

Later, when the Qing army was occupying Thăng Long, Trịnh Bồng turned himself in to emperor Chiêu Thống. He was pardoned but was demoted to Duke of Huệ Địch (Huệ Địch công). After the Qing's defeat in early 1789, Bồng fled to the western region of the country, proclaimed himself to be a lord and built a resistance army against the Tây Sơn. He died in early 1791.

After Gia Long founded the Nguyễn dynasty in 1802, he pardoned the Trịnh clan and allowed their descendants to worship their ancestors.

== Trịnh foreign relations ==
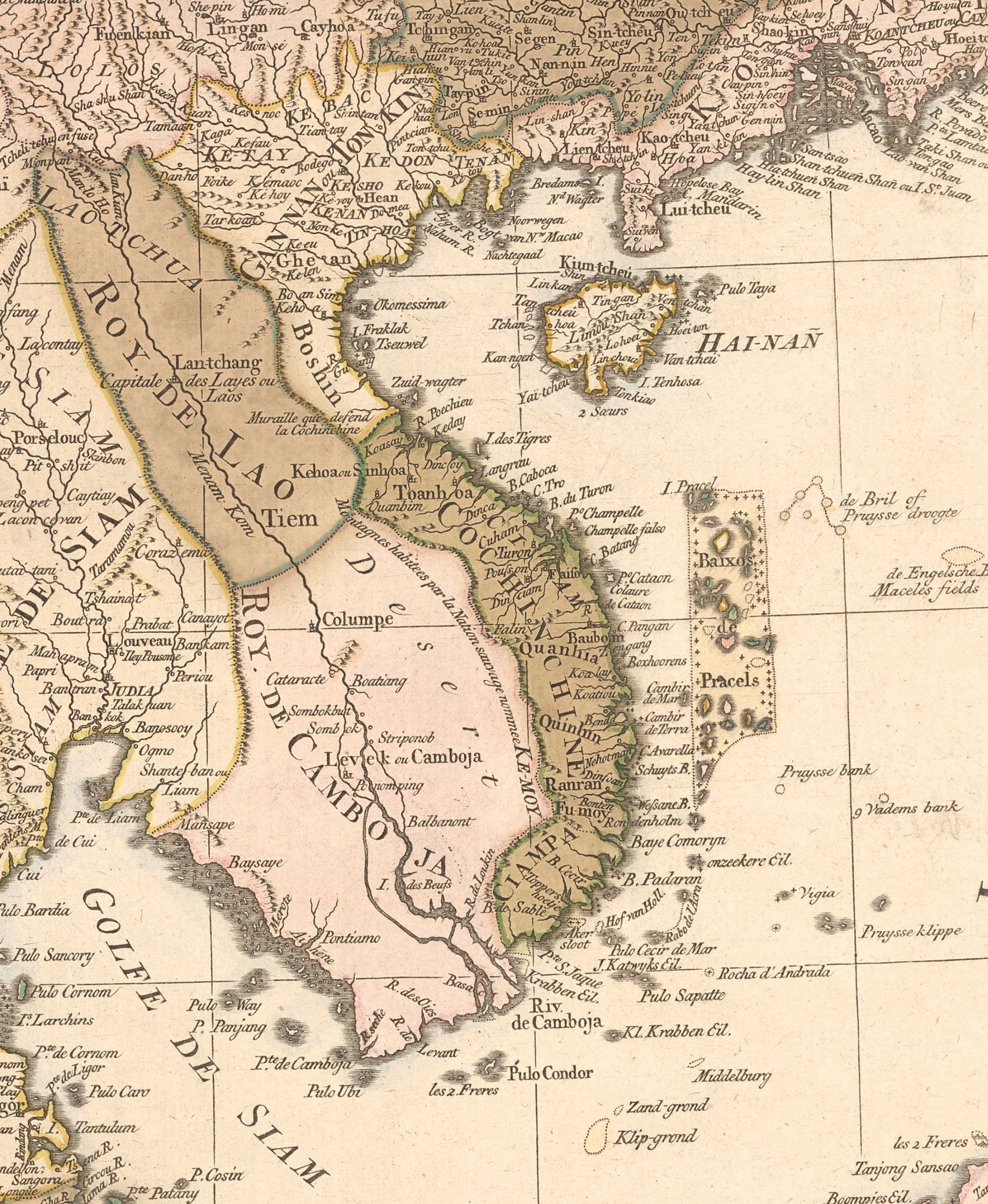
Map of Vietnam in the 18th century, published by a Dutch company in Amsterdam around 1760.

In 1620, French Jesuit scholar Alexandre de Rhodes arrived in Trịnh-controlled Vietnam. He arrived at a mission that had been established at the court in Hanoi around 1615. The priest was a significant figure in relations between Europe and Vietnam. He gained thousands of converts, created a script for writing Vietnamese using a modified version of the European alphabet, and built several churches. However, by 1630 the new Trịnh lord, Trịnh Tráng, decided that De Rhodes represented a threat to Vietnamese society and forced him to leave the country. From this point on, the Trịnh lords periodically tried to suppress Christianity in Vietnam, with moderate success. When the Nguyễn successfully used Portuguese cannon to defend their walls, the Trịnh made contact with the Dutch. The Dutch were willing to sell advanced cannons to the Trịnh. The Dutch, and later the Germans, set up trading posts in Hanoi. For a time, Dutch trade was profitable, but after the war with the Nguyễn ended in 1673, the demand for European weapons rapidly declined. By 1700, the Dutch and English trading posts had closed. The Trịnh were careful in their dealings with the Ming dynasty and Manchu-led Qing dynasty of China. Unlike the Nguyễn lords who were happy to accept large numbers of Ming refugees into their lands, the Trịnh did not. When the Qing conquered the Ming and extended the Qing Empire's borders to Northern Vietnam, the Trịnh treated them as they had treated the Ming Emperors, sending tribute and formal acknowledgements. The Qing intervened twice during the rule of the Trịnh lords, once in 1537, and again in 1788. Both times, the Qing sent an army south because of a formal request for help from the Lê emperors – and both times the intervention was unsuccessful.

== Assessment ==
The Trịnh Lords were, for the most part, intelligent, able, industrious, and long-lived rulers. The unusual dual form of government they developed over two centuries was a creative response to the internal and external obstacles to their rule. They lacked, however, both the power and the moral authority to resolve the contradictions inherent in their system of ruling without reigning.

The Trịnh had lost nearly all popularity by the last half of the 18th century. While the Nguyễn lords, or at least Nguyễn Ánh, enjoyed a great deal of support – as his repeated attempts to regain power in the south show – no equivalent support for the Trịnh survived in the north after the Tây Sơn took power.

== Trịnh lords ==
List of Trịnh rulers
| Name | Image | Lifespan | Ruling year(s) | Emperor(s) | Highest attained title | Temple name | Posthumous name |
|---|---|---|---|---|---|---|---|
| Trịnh Kiểm 鄭檢 | | 1503–1570 | 1545–1570 | Trang Tông Trung Tông Anh Tông | Thái quốc công 太國公 | Thế Tổ 世祖 | Minh Khang Nhân Trí Vũ Trinh Hùng Lược Thái vương 明康仁智武貞雄畧太王 |
| Trịnh Cối 鄭檜 | | ?–1584 | 1570 (6 months) | Anh Tông | Tuấn Đức hầu 俊德侯 | | |
| Trịnh Tùng 鄭松 | | 1550–1623 | 1570–1623 | Anh Tông Thế Tông Kính Tông Thần Tông | Bình An vương 平安王 | Thành Tổ 成祖 | Cung Hoà Khoan Chính Triết vương 恭和寬正哲王 |
| Trịnh Tráng 鄭梉 | | 1577–1657 | 1623–1657 | Chân Tông Thần Tông | Thanh vương 清王 | Văn Tổ 文祖 | Nghị vương 誼王 |
| Trịnh Tạc 鄭柞 | | 1606–1682 | 1657–1682 | Thần Tông Huyền Tông Gia Tông Hy Tông | Tây vương 西王 | Hoằng Tổ 弘祖 | Dương vương 陽王 |
| Trịnh Căn 鄭根 | | 1633–1709 | 1682–1709 | Hy Tông Dụ Tông | Định vương 定王 | Chiêu Tổ 昭祖 | Khang vương 康王 |
| Trịnh Cương 鄭棡 | | 1686–1729 | 1709–1729 | Dụ Tông Duệ Tông | An vương 安王 | Hi Tổ 禧祖 | Nhân vương 仁王 |
| Trịnh Giang 鄭杠 | | 1711–1762 | 1729–1740 | Duệ Tông Thuần Tông Ý Tông | Uy vương 威王 | Dụ Tổ 裕祖 | Thuận vương 順王 |
| Trịnh Doanh 鄭楹 | | 1720–1767 | 1740–1767 | Ý Tông Hiển Tông | Minh vương 明王 | Nghị Tổ 毅祖 | Ân vương 恩王 |
| Trịnh Sâm 鄭森 | | 1739–1782 | 1767–1782 | Hiển Tông | Tĩnh vương 靖王 | Thánh Tổ 聖祖 | Thịnh vương 盛王 |
| Trịnh Cán 鄭檊 | | 1777–1782 | 1782 (1 month, Đặng Thị Huệ acts as regent) | Hiển Tông | Điện Đô vương 奠都王 | | |
| Trịnh Tông 鄭棕 | | 1763–1786 | 1782–1786 | Hiển Tông | Đoan Nam vương 端南王 | | Linh vương 靈王 |
| Trịnh Bồng 鄭槰 | | 1749–1791 | 1786–1787 | Chiêu Thống | Yến Đô vương 晏都王 | | |

Traditionally, Trịnh Tùng is considered to be the first "lord", but the Trịnh family had held a great amount of power since Trịnh Kiểm.

== See also ==
- Trịnh (surname)
- List of Vietnamese dynasties
- Nguyễn lords
- Trịnh–Nguyễn War

| Preceded by Mạc dynasty | Ruler of northern Vietnam (along with the Later Lê dynasty); 1545–1787 | Succeeded by Tây Sơn dynasty |
