= Dụ Tông =

- Vietnamese alphabet: Dụ Tông
- Chữ Hán: 裕宗
- Literal meaning: Abundant Ancestor

Dụ Tông is the temple name used for several emperors of Vietnam. It may refer to:

- Trần Dụ Tông (1336–1369, reigned 1341–1369), emperor of the Trần dynasty
- Lê Dụ Tông (1679–1731, reigned 1705–1729), emperor of the Lê dynasty
