= Hôn Đức Công =

Hôn Đức Công may refer to:

- Dương Nhật Lễ, emperor of Đại Việt from 1369 to 1370 during the Trần Dynasty
- Lê Duy Phường, emperor of Đại Việt from 1729 to 1732 during the Later Lê Dynasty
