= Revival Lê dynasty =

Vietnamese dynasty (1533–1789)

Coordinates: 16°28′N 107°36′E

Đại Việt Quốc 大越國
- 1533–1789
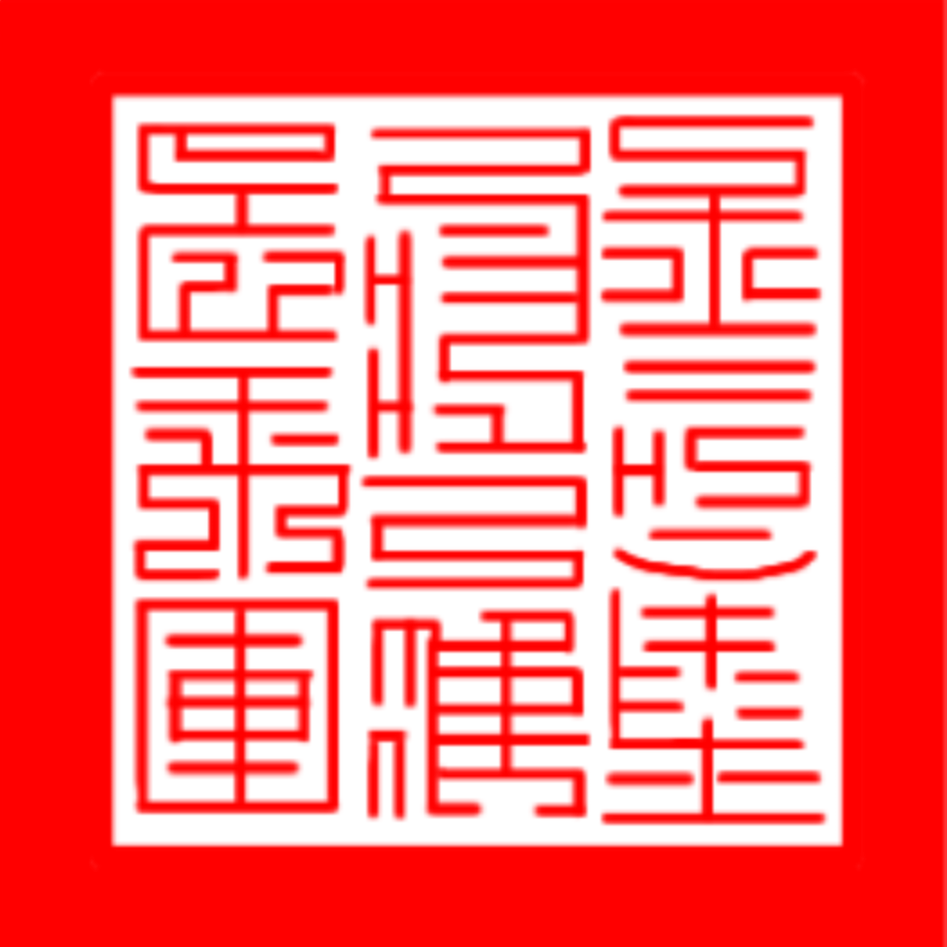
- Seal

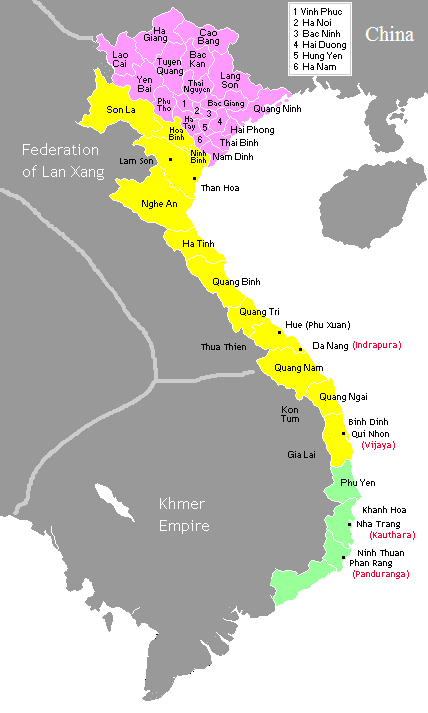
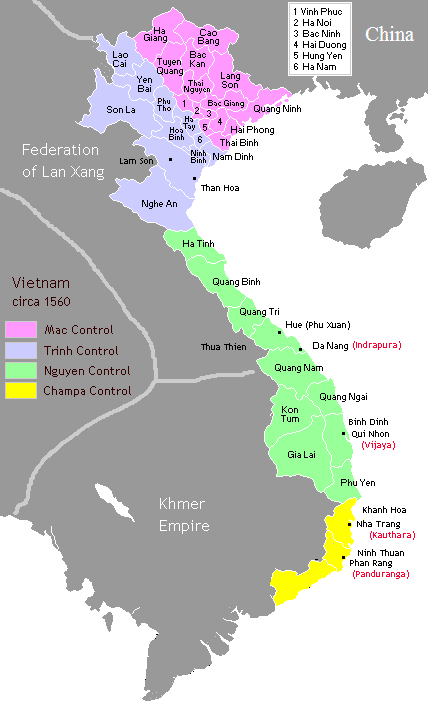
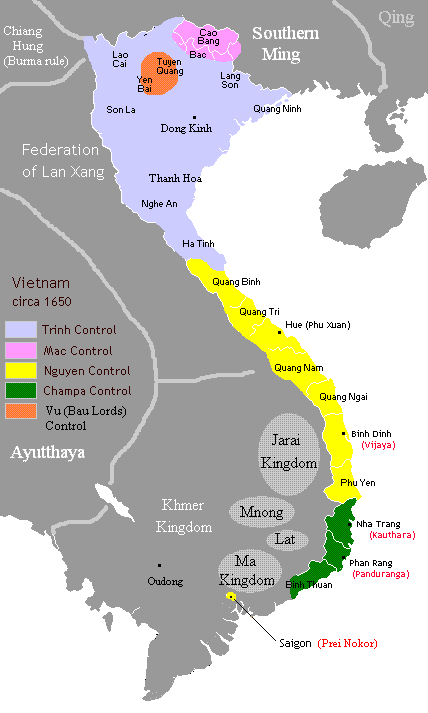

- Map of Đại Việt in 1770s during Trịnh–Nguyễn War Lê dynasty's domain under Trịnh's authority Nguyễn's domain
- Status: Government in exile (1533–1540); Tributary state of China: Ming (1540–1644); Southern Ming (1644–1662); Qing (1662–1788); Rump state under Qing dynasty's protection (1788–1789)
- Capital: Lôi Dương (1539–1542); Tây Đô (1542–1546); Vạn Lại (1546–1592); Đông Kinh (1593–1789)
- Capital-in-exile: Xam Neua (1533–1539)
- Common languages: Annamese
- Religion: Neo-Confucianism, Buddhism, Taoism, Folk religions, Christianity
- Government: Absolute monarchy under hereditary military dictatorship
- Emperor
  - 1533–1548: Lê Trang Tông (first)
  - 1786–1789: Lê Chiêu Thống (last)
- Regents and Viceroys (de facto rulers)
  - 1533–1545 (first): Nguyễn Kim
  - 1545-1786: Trịnh lords
  - 1786-1789 (last): Nguyễn Huệ
- History
  - Inauguration of Lê Trang Tông: 1533
  - Reconquest of Đông Kinh: 1592
  - Return of Nguyễn Hoàng to Thuận–Quảng: 1600
  - Kỷ Dậu Victory: 1789
- Currency: Copper-alloy and zinc cash coins
Preceded by
Mạc dynasty
Succeeded by
Trịnh lords
Nguyễn lords
Tây Sơn dynasty
- Today part of: Vietnam; China; Laos; Cambodia

The Revival Lê dynasty (Vietnamese: Nhà Lê trung hưng, 茹黎中興; Hán-Việt: 黎中興朝, Lê trung hưng triều), also called the Later Lê Restoration in historiography, officially Đại Việt (Chữ Hán: 大越), was a Vietnamese dynasty that existed between 1533 and 1789. The Primal Lê dynasty (1428–1527) and the Revival Lê dynasty (1533–1789) collectively formed the Later Lê dynasty.

This period marked the end of the Primal Lê dynasty which had flourished initially but largely declined after the death of emperor Lê Thánh Tông. As a result, high-ranking mandarin and general Mạc Đăng Dung deposed emperor Lê Cung Hoàng in 1527 and established the Mạc dynasty, ruling the whole territory of Đại Việt. The Lê royalists escaped to the Kingdom of Lan Xang (today Laos). The Right Commander-General of the Five Armies and Marquess of An Thanh (Vietnamese: Hữu vệ Điện tiền tướng quân An Thanh hầu) Nguyễn Kim summoned the people who were still loyal to the Lê emperor and formed a new army to begin a revolt against Mạc Đăng Dung. Subsequently, Nguyễn Kim returned to Đại Việt and led the Lê royalists in a six-year civil war before the Lê were able to capture territories in Thanh Hóa. This marked the beginning of the Southern and Northern dynasties era. The Lê and Mạc would continue the lengthy civil war over the next 40 years.

In 1592, unable to resist the forces of the Lê, the Mạc dynasty retreated to the north and established a new capital at Cao Bằng Province allying with the Ming dynasty of China as a tributary nation against the Lê dynasty. The Revival Lê dynasty eventually recaptured three-quarters of their former kingdom. Inasmuch as the Mac dynasty ruled the northern portion of Đại Việt while the Lê dynasty ruled the remainder of the country, this time became known as the period of Northern and Southern dynasties. After capturing the capital Đông Kinh, Nguyễn Kim made the son of the former emperor Lê Chiêu Tông, Lê Trang Tông emperor of Đại Việt. The title was given to Lê Trang Tông, however, only as a figurehead. Nguyễn Kim retained the real power for himself and ruled the kingdom. In 1545, Nguyễn Kim was poisoned by Dương Chấp Nhất), a surrendered general of the Mạc dynasty. The power of royal court was then passed to Nguyễn Kim's son-in-law Trịnh Kiểm who became the founder of the Trịnh lords.

Later, the first son of Nguyễn Kim, Nguyễn Uông was assassinated by Trịnh Kiểm. Nguyễn Kim's second son, the Marquis of Hạ khê (Hạ khê hầu) Nguyễn Hoàng relocated to the south, became the Viceroy of Thuận Hoá province and the first of the Nguyễn lords, and started a revolt against the reign of the Trịnh lords. As such, during the Trịnh–Nguyễn Civil War, Đại Việt was divided for almost two centuries into Đàng Ngoài and Đàng Trong. This conflict only ended then the Tây Sơn brothers led the peasants in the Tây Sơn rebellion eventually conquering the entire kingdom in 1789. The last emperor of Lê dynasty Lê Chiêu Thống fled to exile in China and the dynasty collapsed.

== History ==
In 1533, the exiled Lê loyalist Nguyễn Kim brought prince Lê Duy Ninh back to the Lê throne as emperor Lê Trang Tông and began to reconquer the country. Mạc Đăng Dung ruled in Hanoi till his death in 1541 and his descendants ruled in Hanoi until 1592. The country was divided into two parts though gradually the Lê gained advantages.

In 1592, with the conquest of Đông Kinh, Vietnamese emperor Lê Thế Tông, was installed in the ancient capital. The Lê emperors sat as figurehead rulers in Đông Kinh until the Tây Sơn Revolt finally swept the Trịnh and the Le out of power. The following is the official list of Lê emperors from 1533 until 1789:

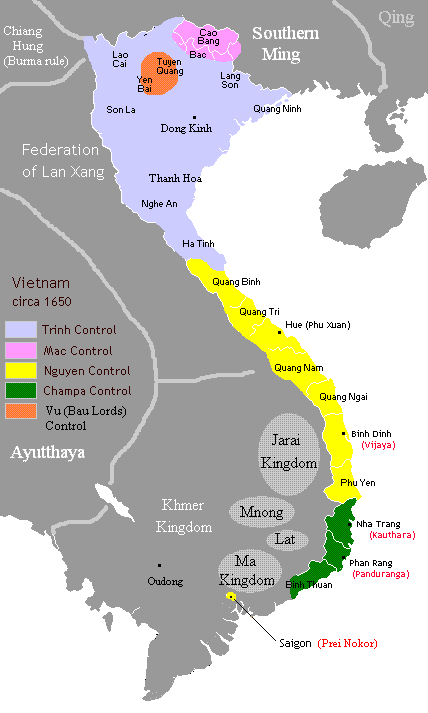
Map of Vietnam showing (roughly) the areas controlled by the Trịnh, Nguyen, Mac, and Panduranga about the year 1650.

- Lê Trang Tông (1533–48) – A son of Prince Ý named Ninh. Crowned Emperor at the "Winter palace" in 1533. Officially recognized as the King by a Ming delegation in 1536. An attack on the Mac forces led by the Le general Nguyễn Kim resulted in the partition of Vietnam in 1545, with the Nguyễn family seizing control of the southern part of the country as far north as what is now Thanh Hóa Province. The Nguyễn, who took the hereditary title chúa (English: lord), continued to profess loyalty to the Lê dynasty.
- Lê Trung Tông (1548–56) – During his reign, the war with the Mạc continued.
- Lê Anh Tông (1556–73) – In 1572, the Royal army under Trịnh Tùng captured Hanoi. But a year later, the Trịnh army was thrown out of Hanoi. The Emperor took advantage of the chaos to flee to Nghệ An Province to escape the control of Trịnh Tùng. However, Trịnh Tùng simply appointed a new Emperor and had Lê Anh Tông assassinated.
- Lê Thế Tông (1573–99) – By the late sixteenth century the Trinh family had ousted the Mac family and had begun to rule the northern half of the country also in the name of the Lê dynasty. When Hanoi was captured for the second (and final) time in 1592, the Court moved back to the old capital. The Emperor gave Trịnh Tùng the title Pacifying Prince (Binh An Vương) in recognition of his great victory over the Mạc. The Trinh, who, like the Nguyễn, took the title chúa, spent most of the seventeenth century attempting to depose the Nguyễn.
- Lê Kính Tông (1600–19) – At the start of his reign, Nguyễn Hoàng, one of the Nguyễn Lords refused to accept imperial edicts from Le Kinh Tong. After 19 years as a figurehead, Le Kinh Tong was involved in a conspiracy to kill Trịnh Tùng and take power. He was executed and a new Emperor appointed.
- Lê Thần Tông (1619–43) – At the start of his rule, Nguyễn Phúc Nguyên, leader of the Nguyễn Lords, refused to acknowledge the new Emperor. After seven years of increasing tension, the great war between the Trịnh and the Nguyễn started (see Trịnh–Nguyễn War). Le Thần Tong saw the death of Trịnh Tùng and the rule by Trịnh Tráng. In 1643 he abdicated the throne in favor of his son. In order to repulse invading Trinh forces, the Nguyễn in 1631 completed the building of two great walls, six meters high and eighteen kilometers long, on their northern frontier. The Trinh, with 100,000 troops, 500 elephants, and 500 large junks, were numerically far superior to their southern foe. The Nguyễn, however, were better equipped, having by this time acquired Portuguese weapons and gunpowder, and, as the defending force, had the support of the local people.
- Lê Chân Tông (1643–49) – Died after only six years, just after the Royal (Trịnh) army suffered a disastrous defeat at the hands of the Nguyễn. His father took the throne again.
- Lê Thần Tông (again: 1649–62) – Regained the throne after the early death of his son. This was a time of many defeats for the Royal army (i.e. the Trịnh) in their long war against the Nguyễn. But by the old Emperor's death, Trịnh Tạc had restored the situation and defeated the Nguyễn offensive (see Trịnh–Nguyễn War for details).
- Lê Huyền Tông (1663–71) – During his time, the Mạc were driven from their last bit of territory in the far north of Vietnam. In the south, there was no activity in the Trịnh-Nguyen war.
- Lê Gia Tông (1672–75) – During his time, the last great offensive took place against the Nguyễn walls by Trịnh Tạc. The offensive failed after seven months of fighting and a peace treaty between the Trịnh and the Nguyễn was agreed. This began the long 100-year peace between the north and south of Vietnam. During that time, the Nguyễn continued its southward expansion into lands held, or formerly held, by the Cham and the Khmer. The Trinh, meanwhile, consolidated its authority in the north, instituting administrative reforms and supporting scholarship. The nobility and scholar-officials of both north and south, however, continued to block the development of manufacturing and trade, preferring to retain a feudal, peasant society, which they could control.
- Lê Hi Tông (1676–1704) – This was a peaceful reign though in 1677 the last remnants of the Mạc attacked Vietnam out of China. They were defeated. This Emperor was forced to abdicate his throne in favor of his son by the new Trịnh Lord, Trịnh Cương.
- Lê Dụ Tông (1705–28) – A peaceful time though some Christian missionaries were persecuted. The Emperor and Trịnh Cương died within months of each other in 1728.
- Hôn-đức Duke (1729–32) – The new Emperor was put in prison by the new Trịnh lord Trịnh Giang and was then murdered after four years.
- Lê Thuần Tông (1732–35) – Nothing of import during his short rule.
- Lê Ý Tông (1735–40) – Trịnh Giang foolishly convinced the Chinese government to give him the title Supreme King of Annam (An Nam Thượng Vương). This was widely seen as a usurpation of the Lê emperor's position and rebellion started throughout north Vietnam. Trịnh Giang gave up his power in 1738, the king abdicated just a year later.
- Lê Hiển Tông (1740–86) – This was a time of many revolts but the new Trịnh Lord, Trịnh Sâm managed to suppress them all. The Tây Sơn revolt started in the south in 1772 and the Imperial force under Trịnh lord seized the opportunity to end the 100-year truce and conquered Huế. However, decimated by diseases, Trịnh army was forced to retreat to the North, leaving a power vacuum for the rising Tây Sơn.

=== Naming conventions of emperors ===
Temple name	Posthumous name	Real name	Time	Era name	Temple
Trang Tông	Dụ hoàng đế	Lê Duy Ninh	1533–1548	Nguyên Hòa	Cảnh Lăng
Trung Tông	Vũ hoàng đế	Lê Duy Huyên	1548–1556	Thuận Bình	Diên Lăng
Anh Tông	Tuấn hoàng đế	Lê Duy Bang	1556–1573	Thiên Hựu (1557); Chính trị (1558–1571); Hồng Phúc (1572–1573)	Bố Vệ Lăng
Thế Tông	Nghị hoàng đế	Lê Duy Đàm	1573–1599	Gia Thái (1573–1577); Quang Hưng (1578–1599)	chưa biết
Kính Tông	Hiển Nhân Dụ Khánh Tuy Phúc Huệ hoàng đế (Giản Huy đế)	Lê Duy Tân	1599–1619	Thuận Đức (1600); Hoằng Định (1601–1619)	Hoa Loan Lăng (Bố Vệ Lăng)
Thần Tông (first)	Uyên hoàng đế	Lê Duy Kỳ	1619–1643	Vĩnh Tộ (1620–1628); Đức Long (1629–1634); Dương Hoà (1634–1643)	Quần Ngọc Lăng
Chân Tông	Thuận hoàng đế	Lê Duy Hựu	1643–1649	Phúc Thái	Hoa Phố Lăng
Thần Tông (second)	Uyên hoàng đế	Lê Duy Kỳ	1649–1662	Khánh Đức (1649–1652); Thịnh Đức (1653–1657); Vĩnh Thọ (1658–1661); Vạn Khánh (1662)	Quần Ngọc Lăng
Huyền Tông	Khoát Đạt Duệ Thông Cương Nghị Trung Chính Ôn Nhu Hoà Lạc Khâm Minh; Văn Tứ Doãn Cung Khắc Nhượng Mục hoàng đế	Lê Duy Vũ	1663–1671	Cảnh Trị	Quả Thịnh Lăng
Gia Tông	Khoan Minh Mẫn Đạt Anh Quả Huy Nhu Khắc Nhân Đốc Nghĩa Mỹ hoàng đế	Lê Duy Cối (Lê Duy Khoái)	1672–1675	Dương Đức (1672–1673); Đức Nguyên (1674–1675)	Phúc An Lăng
Hy Tông	Thông Mẫn Anh Quả Đôn Khoát Khoan Dụ Vĩ Độ Huy Cung Chương hoàng đế	Lê Duy Cáp (Lê Duy Hiệp)	1675–1705	Vĩnh Trị (1678–1680); Chính Hoà (1680–1705)	Phú Lăng
Dụ Tông	Thuần Chính Huy Nhu Ôn Giản Từ Tường Khoan Huệ Tôn Mẫu Hòa hoàng đế	Lê Duy Đường	1706–1729	Vĩnh Thịnh (1706–1719); Bảo Thái (1720–1729)	Cổ Đô Lăng, sau chuyển sang Kim Thạch Lăng
	Hôn Đức công	Lê Duy Phường	1729–1732	Vĩnh Khánh	Kim Lũ
Thuần Tông	Khoan Hào Đôn Mẫn Nhu Tốn Cẩn Khác Trần Tiềm Giản hoàng đế	Lê Duy Tường	1732–1735	Long Đức	Bình Ngô Lăng
Ý Tông	Ôn Gia Trang Túc Khải Túy Minh Mẫn Khoan Hồng Uyên Duệ Huy hoàng đế	Lê Duy Thận (Lê Duy Chấn)	1735–1740	Vĩnh Hựu	Phù Lê Lăng
Hiển Tông	Vĩnh hoàng đế	Lê Duy Diêu	1740–1786	Cảnh Hưng	Bàn Thạch Lăng
	Mẫn hoàng đế	Lê Duy Khiêm (Lê Duy Kỳ)	1786–1789	Chiêu Thống	Bàn Thạch Lăng

Temple name	Posthumous name	Real name	Cause
Hiếu Tông	Nhân Emperor (仁皇帝)	Lê Duy Khoáng	Father of Lê Anh Tông
Hựu Tông	Diên Emperor (衍皇帝)	Lê Duy Vĩ	Father of Lê Mẫn Đế

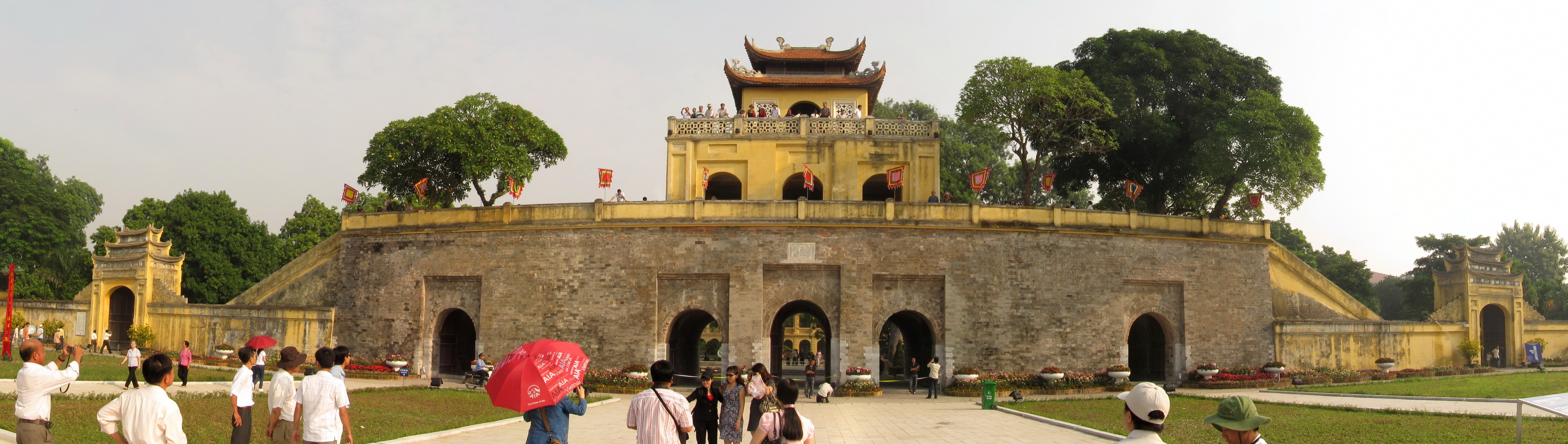
Đoan Môn, the main gate to the palatial complex of the Revival Lê emperors

== Military ==
The stalemate between the Trịnh and the Nguyễn lords that began at the end of the 17th century did not, however, mark the beginning of a period of peace and prosperity. Instead the decades of continual warfare between the two families had left the ruists and peasantry in a weakened state, the victim of taxes levied to support the courts and their military adventures. Having to meet their tax obligations had forced many peasants off the land and facilitated the acquisition of large tracts by a few wealthy landowners, nobles, and scholar—officials. Because scholar—officials were exempted from having to pay a land tax, the more land they acquired, the greater was the burden that fell on those peasants who had been able to retain their land. In addition, the peasantry faced new taxes on staple items such as charcoal, salt, silk, and cinnamon, and on commercial activities such as fishing and mining. The disparate condition of the economy led to neglect of the extensive network of irrigation systems as well.

As they fell into disrepair, disastrous flooding and famine resulted, unleashing great numbers of starving and landless people to wander aimlessly about the countryside. The widespread suffering in both north and south led to numerous peasant revolts between 1730 and 1770. Although the uprisings took place throughout the country, they were essentially local phenomena, breaking out spontaneously from similar local causes. The occasional coordination between and among local movements did not result in any national organization or leadership. Moreover, most of the uprisings were conservative, in that the leaders supported the restoration of the Lê dynasty. They did, however, put forward demands for land reform, more equitable taxes, and rice for all. Landless peasants accounted for most of the initial support for the various rebellions, but they were often joined later by craftsmen, fishermen, miners, and traders, who had been taxed out of their occupations. Some of these movements enjoyed limited success for a short time, but it was not until 1771 that any of the peasant revolts had a lasting national impact.

The Tây Sơn were not content to simply conquer the southern provinces of Quangnam. After a decade of fairly successful fighting in the south against the Nguyễn Lords, Nguyễn Huệ (the leading general of the Tây Sơn and no relation to the Nguyễn ruling family) and his army marched north in 1785. The Royal army under Trịnh Tông vanquished by Nguyễn Huệ. Trịnh Tông committed suicide and the Lê Emperor submitted to the wishes of the victorious Huệ by giving his daughter in marriage to him. Huệ returned south and a few months later, the old emperor died.

Lê Mẫn Đế (1786–1788). The last Lê emperor. At the start of his reign the Trịnh tried to reassert control over the government. This provoked another march north from Nguyễn Huệ and so the Emperor and the Trịnh fled from Dongkinh. The Emperor's mother and the Trịnh went to the imperial court of the Qing Empire to ask for aid against the Tây Sơn. The Qianlong Emperor of the Qing Empire under the pretense of restoring Lê dynasty dispatched a large force to invade Northern Vietnam.

At the beginning of the war, Nguyễn Huệ's troops retreated to the South, refused to engage the Qing army. He raised a large army of his own and defeated the invader in the Lunar New year Eve of 1789. Lê Chiêu Thống fled north into China, never to return. Lê Mẫn Đế went to Beijing where "he was appointed a Chinese mandarin of the fourth rank and was enrolled under the Tatar banners. His family also remained in China, and from that date many former Lê followers, who had not lost their hatred for the Tây Sơn, expected to find in every rebel who raised the flag of rebellion in their country a descendant of the old royal bloodline. The last of these insurrections was that of the Brigadier General Li Hung Tsai in 1878".

== Culture ==
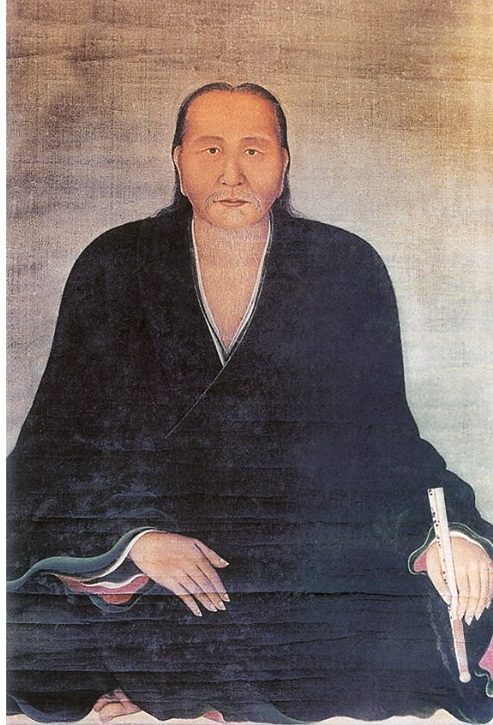
Portrait of Nguyễn Quý Đức (1648–1720) wearing áo giao lĩnh.

The seventeenth century was also a period in which European missionaries and merchants became a serious factor in Vietnamese court life and politics. Although both had arrived by the early sixteenth century, neither foreign merchants nor missionaries had much impact on Vietnam before the seventeenth century. The Portuguese, Dutch, English, and French had all established trading posts in Phố Hiến by 1680. Fighting among the Europeans and opposition by the Vietnamese made the enterprises unprofitable, however, and all of the foreign trading posts were closed by 1700.

European missionaries had occasionally visited Vietnam for short periods of time, with little impact, beginning in the early sixteenth century. The best known of the early missionaries was Alexandre de Rhodes, a French Jesuit who was sent to Hanoi in 1627, where he quickly learned the language and began preaching in Vietnamese. Initially, Rhodes was well received by the Trinh court, and he reportedly baptized more than 6,000 converts; however, his success probably led to his expulsion in 1630. He is credited with perfecting a romanized system of writing the Vietnamese language (Chữ Quốc ngữ), which was probably developed as the joint effort of several missionaries, including Rhodes. He wrote the first catechism in Vietnamese and published a Vietnamese-Latin-Portuguese dictionary; these works were the first books printed in Quốc ngữ. Quốc ngữ was used initially only by missionaries; chữ Hán and chữ Nôm continued to be used by the court and the bureaucracy. The French later supported the use of Quốc ngữ, which, because of its simplicity, led to a high degree of literacy and a flourishing of Vietnamese literature. After being expelled from Vietnam, Rhodes spent the next thirty years seeking support for his missionary work from the Vatican and the French Roman Catholic hierarchy as well as making several more trips to Vietnam.

The art forms of that time prospered and produced items of great artistic value, despite the upheavals and wars. Woodcarving was especially highly developed and produced items that were used for daily use or worship. Many of these items can be seen in the National Museum in Hanoi.

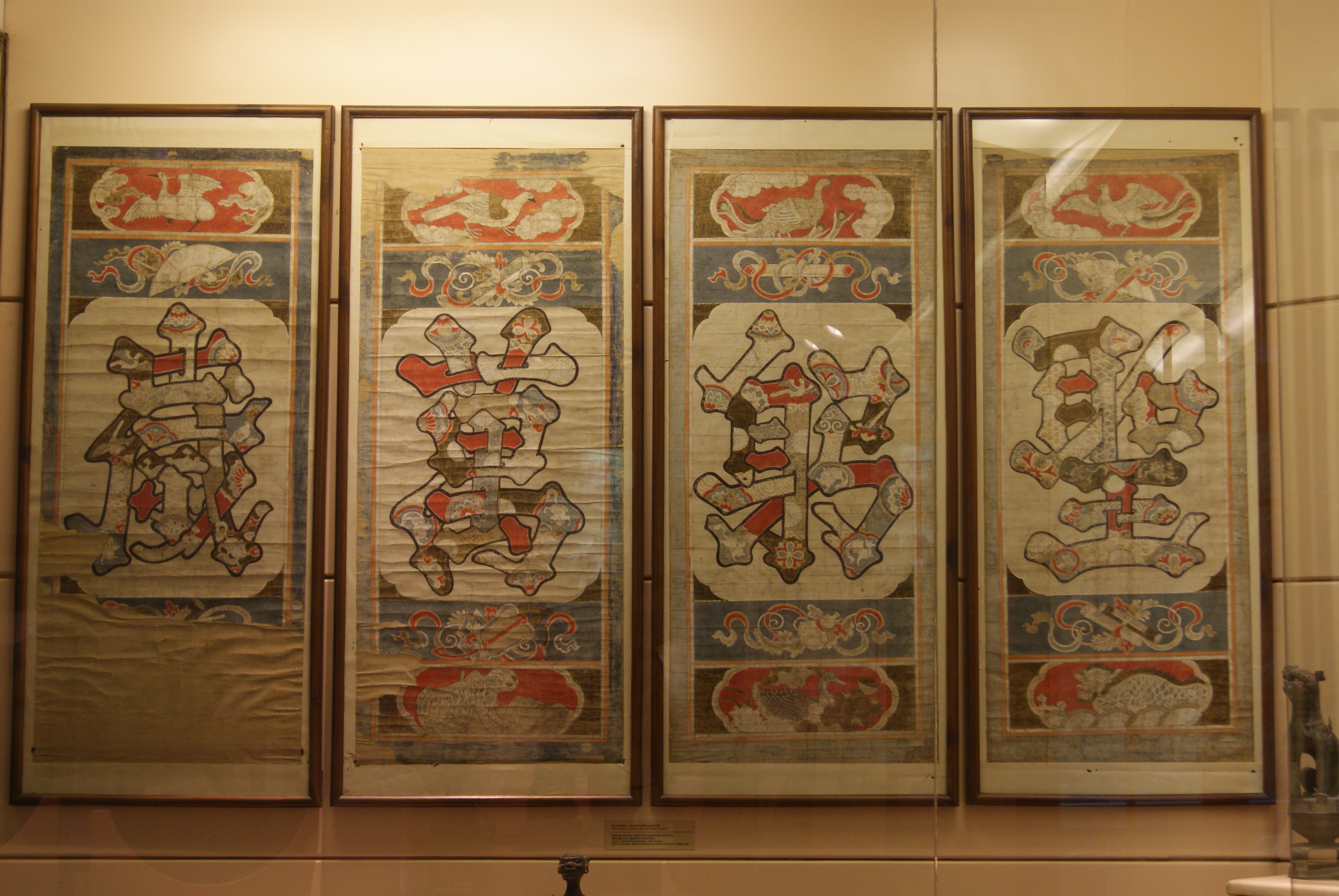
Woodcut paintings "Thánh Cung vạn tuế" ("Long live his Imperial Majesty") from the 18th-century Nghệ An.

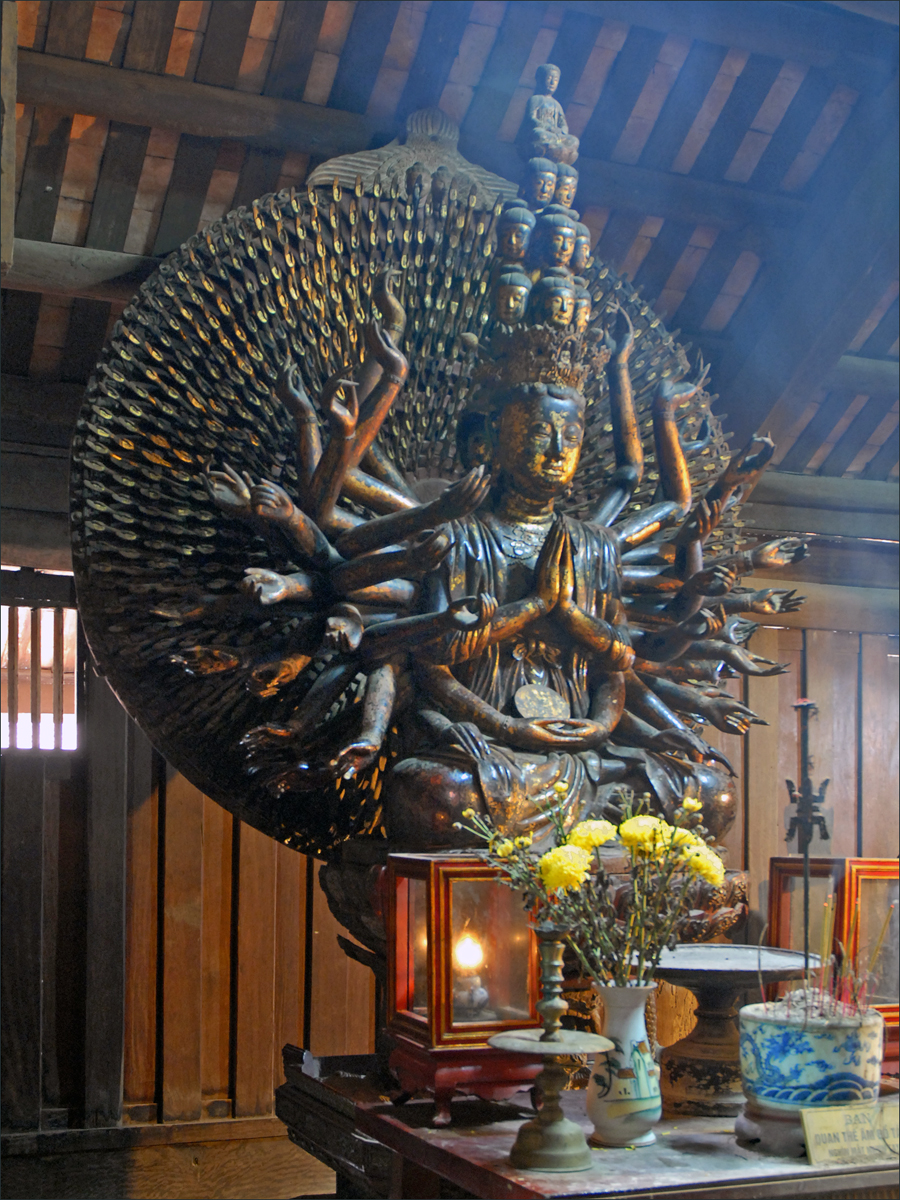
Statue of Avalokiteshvara Bodhisattva, crimson and gilded wood, Revival Lê dynasty, autumn of Bính Thân year (1656), from Bút Tháp Temple in Bắc Ninh Province.

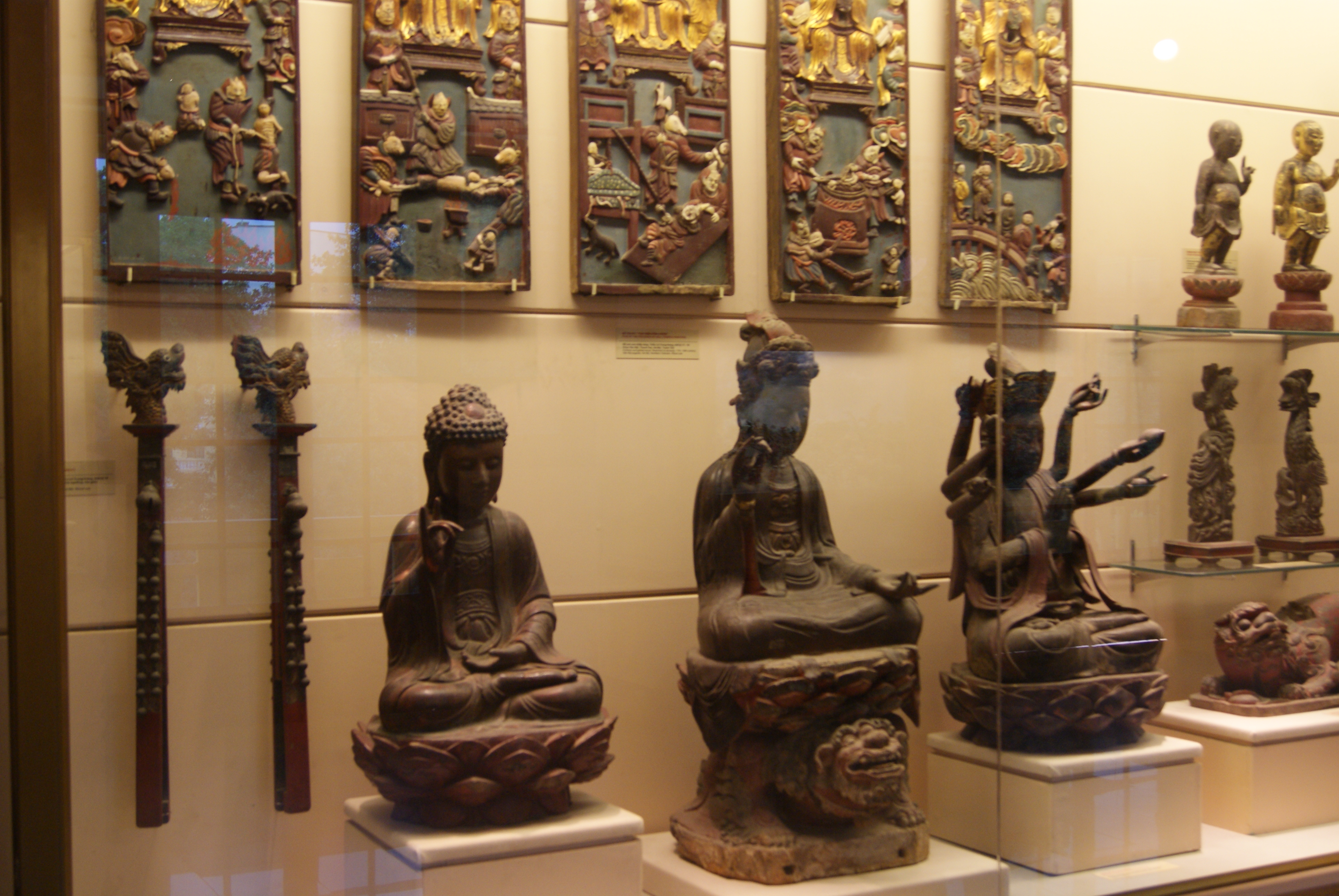
Wooden art pieces of the seventeenth century.

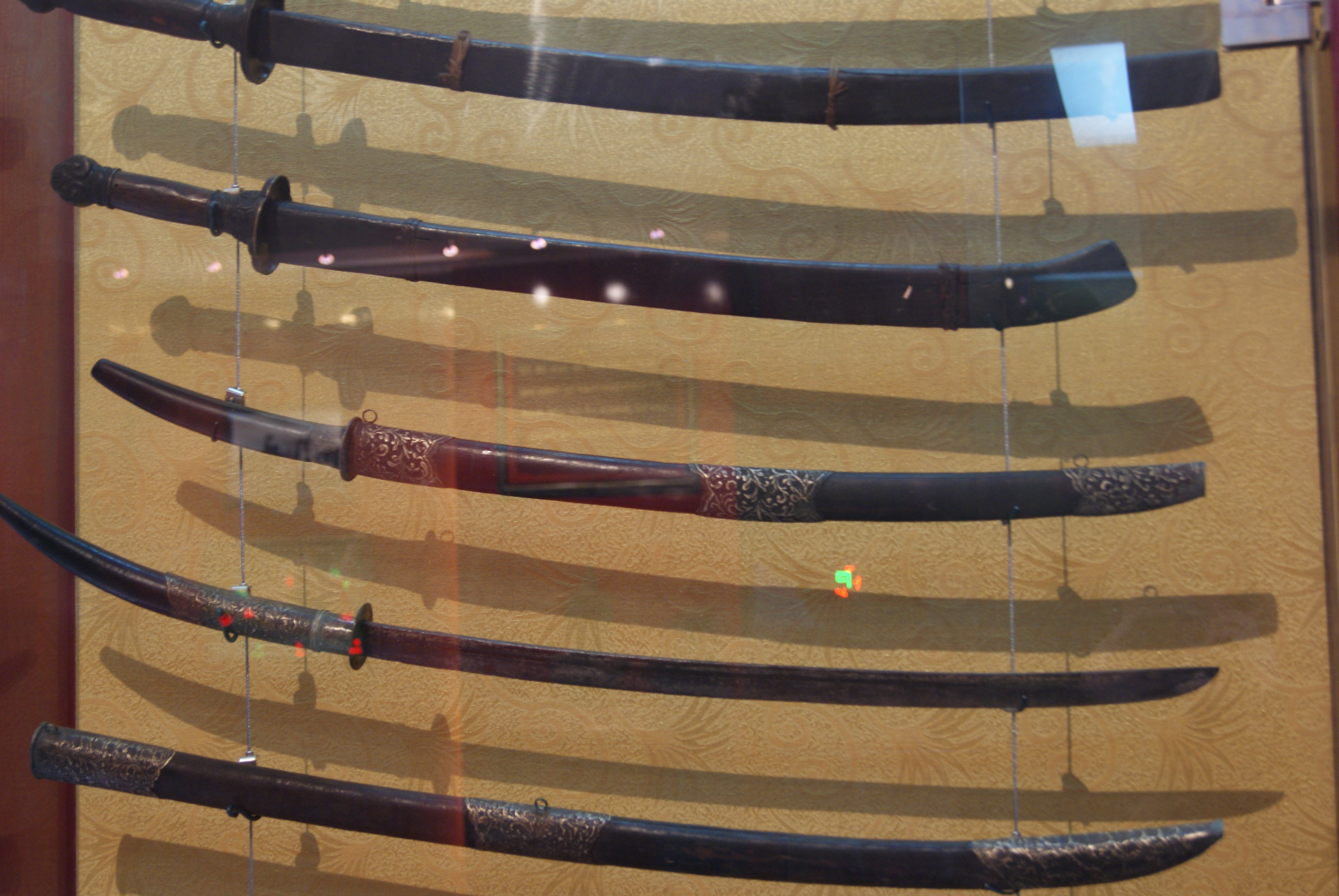
Eighteenth century blades in Việt Nam.

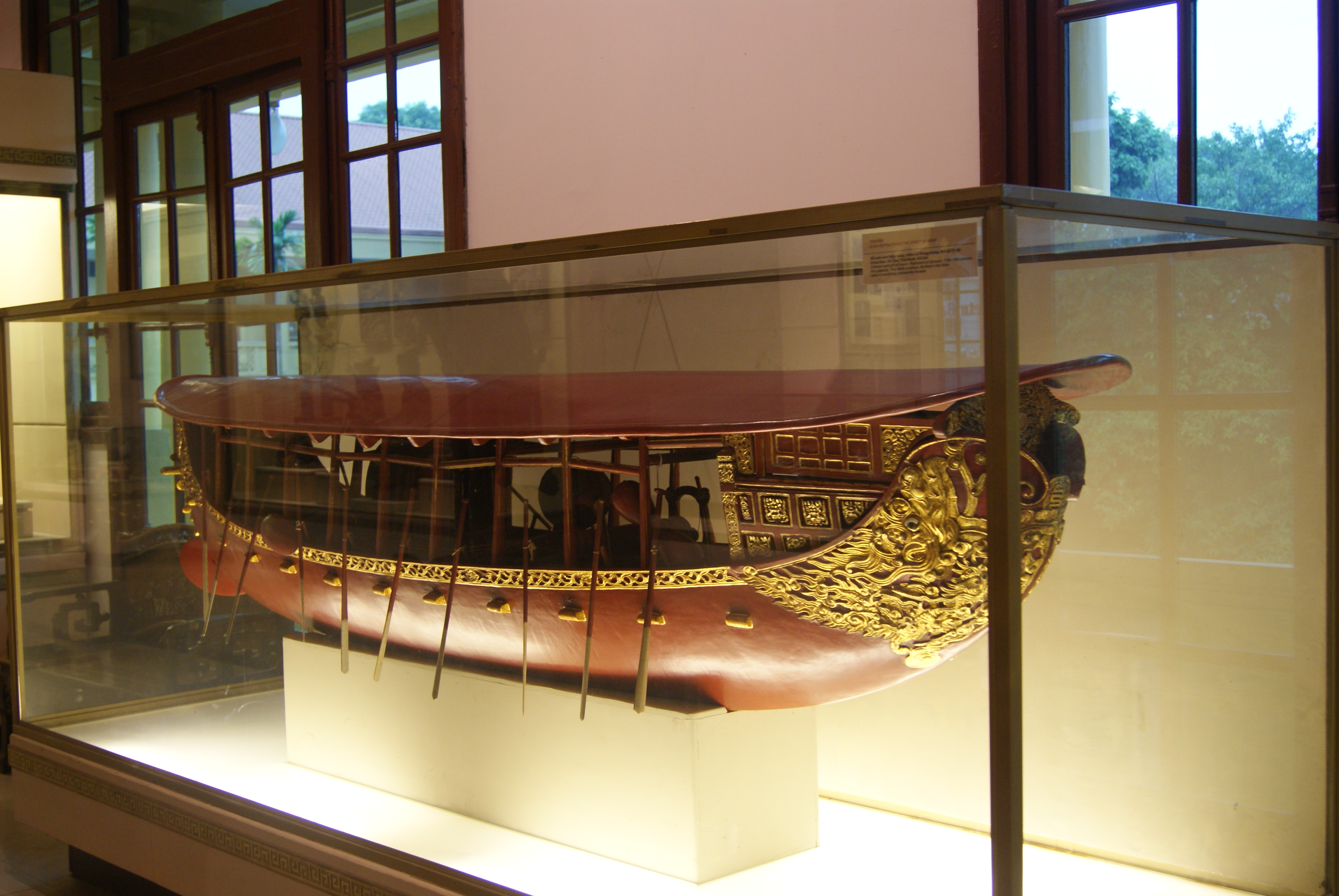
Model of Vietnamese gunboat, seventeenth century, object of worship at Keo Temple in Thái Bình.

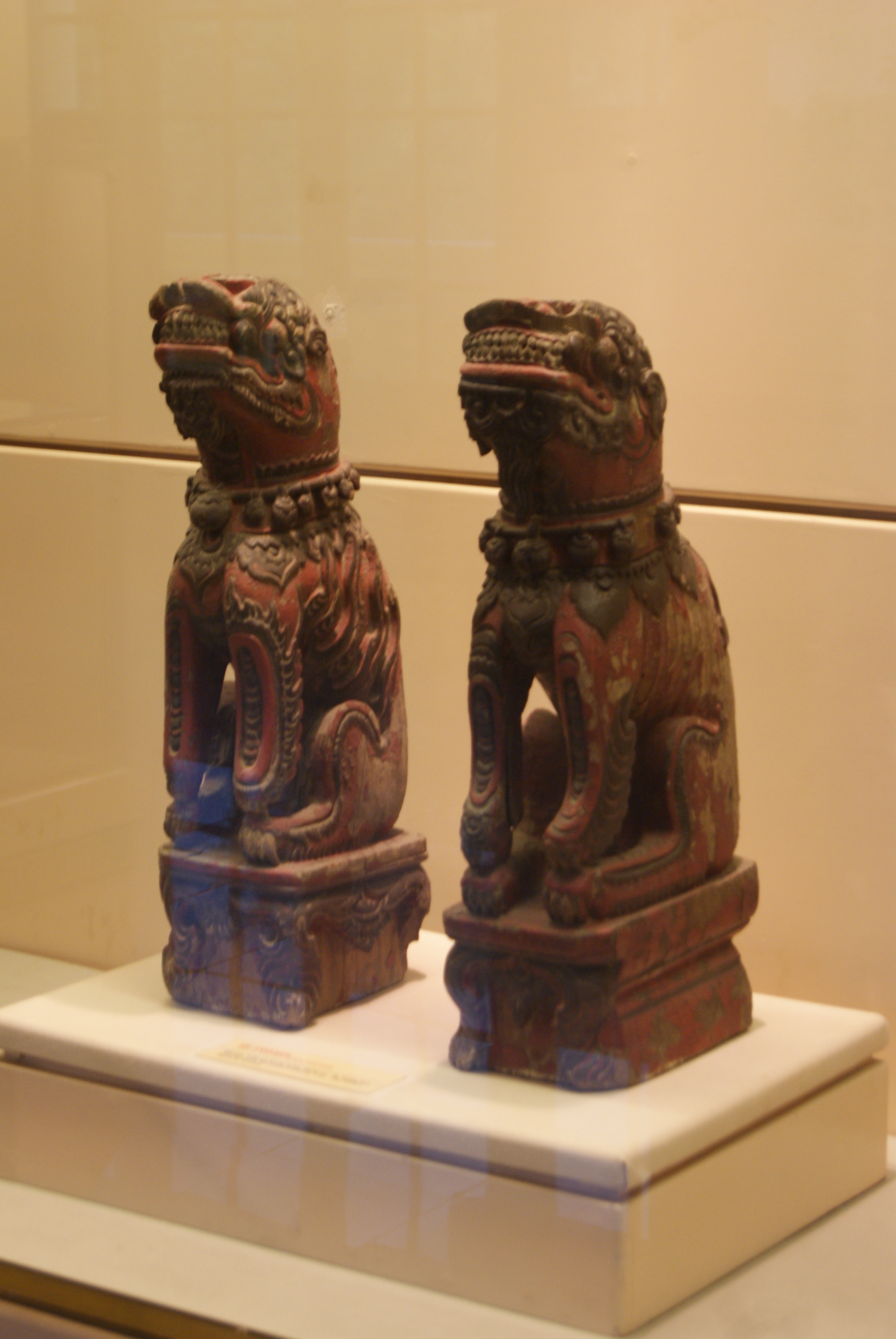
Nghê (mythological beast) figurines, crimson and gilded wood, eighteenth century.

Preceded by Mạc dynasty	Dynasty of Vietnam; 1533–1789	Succeeded by Tây Sơn dynasty

== See also ==
- Lê dynasty
- Mạc dynasty
- Trịnh lords
- Nguyễn lords
