= Trương Thị Trong =

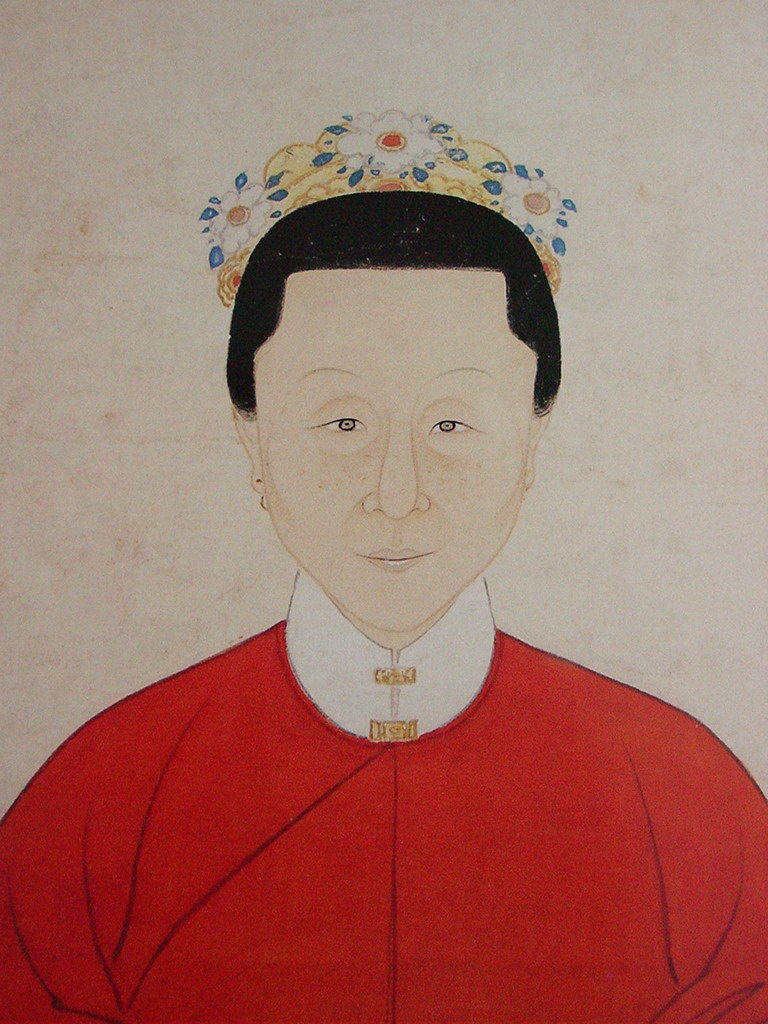
- Trương Thị Trong portrait.
- Born: Lê village, Như Quỳnh commune, Văn Lâm District, Hải Đông town, Annam
- Died: Đông Kinh, Annam
- Spouse: Trịnh Cương

Trương Thị Trong (chữ Hán: 張氏𤄯, ? – ?) was a consort of lord Trịnh Cương.

== Biography ==
Consort Trương Thị Trong had the courtesy name Ngọc Trong (玉𤄯), was born at Lê village, Như Quỳnh commune, Văn Lâm district, Hải Đông town (now Hưng Yên province). She was the third daughter of military official Trương Đôn Hậu and his wife Nguyễn Thị (posthumous name Lady Thục Tiết). Essentially Lê village's Trương clan was the distaff-side relations of Trịnh lords, so lady Trương Thị Trong has entered Trịnh's palace to become the consort Nội-thị cung-tần (內侍宮嬪) of lord Trịnh Cương (1686–1729) when she grew up. She always spent free and boring times composing verses.

== See also ==
- Trịnh Cương
