= Thuan Tong =

Thuận Tông and Thuần Tông are different temple names used for emperors of Vietnam.

Thuan Tong may refer to:

- Trần Thuận Tông (1378–1399, reigned 1388–1398), emperor of the Trần dynasty
- Lê Thuần Tông (1699–1735, reigned 1732–1735), emperor of the Lê dynasty
