= Lê Ý Tông =

Lê Ý Tông 黎懿宗
- Emperor of Đại Việt

Emperor of the Revival Lê dynasty
- Reign: 1735–1740
- Predecessor: Lê Thuần Tông
- Successor: Lê Hiển Tông
- Regent: Trịnh Giang

Retired Emperor of the Revival Lê dynasty
- Reign: 1740–1758
- Born: 29 March 1719; Đông Kinh, Đại Việt
- Died: 10 August 1759 (aged 40); Đông Kinh, Đại Việt
- Burial: Phù Lê Tomb
Names
- Lê Duy Thận (黎維祳)
Era name and dates
- Vĩnh Hựu (永佑): 1735–1740
Posthumous name
- Ôn Gia Trang Túc Khải Túy Minh Mẫn Khoan Hồng Uyên Duệ Huy Hoàng đế
Temple name
- Ý Tông (懿宗)
- House: Revival Lê dynasty
- Father: Lê Dụ Tông

Lê Ý Tông (黎懿宗 29 March 1719 – 10 August 1759) was the third-last emperor of the Vietnamese Lê dynasty, reigning only nominally under the power of Trịnh Giang of the Trịnh lords. He reigned from 1735 to 1740 and was succeeded by Lê Hiển Tông.

Preceded by Lê Thuần Tông	Emperor of Vietnam; 1740–1786	Succeeded by Lê Hiển Tông
