= Lê Hy Tông =

Lê Hy Tông 黎熙宗
- Emperor of Đại Việt
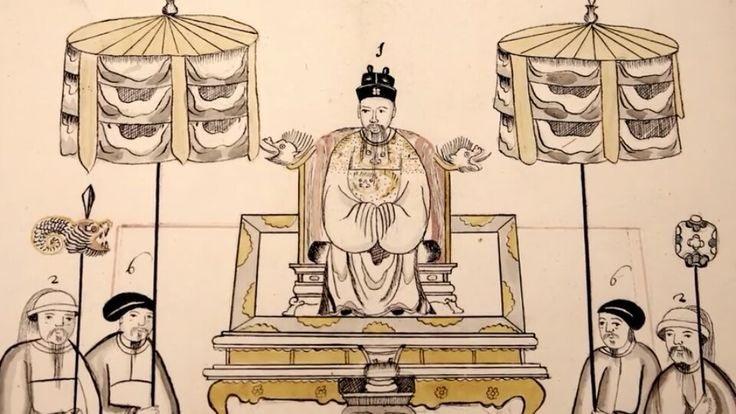
- Emperor Le hy Tong on throne

Emperor of Revival Lê dynasty
- Reign: 1675–1705
- Predecessor: Lê Gia Tông
- Successor: Lê Dụ Tông
- Regent: Trịnh Tạc (1675–1682); Trịnh Căn (1682–1705)

Retired Emperor of Revival Lê dynasty
- Reign: 1705–1716
- Born: 22 April 1663; Đông Kinh, Đại Việt
- Died: 4 June 1716 (aged 53); Đông Kinh, Đại Việt
- Burial: Phú Ninh Tomb (富寧陵)
Names
- Lê Duy Cáp (黎維祫)
Era name and dates
- Vĩnh Trị (永治): 1676–1680; Chính Hòa (正和): 1680–1705
Posthumous name
- Thông Mẫn Anh Quả Đôn Khoát Khoan Dụ Vĩ Độ Huy Cung Chương hoàng đế (聰敏英果敦闊寬裕偉度徽恭章皇帝)
Temple name
- Hy Tông (熙宗)
- House: House of Lê
- Father: Lê Thần Tông
- Mother: Nguyễn Thị Ngọc Tấn

Lê Hy Tông (黎熙宗, 22 April 1663 – 4 June 1716) was the 10th emperor of the Vietnamese Revival Lê Dynasty and 21st emperor of Vietnamese Later Lê dynasty.

== Biography ==
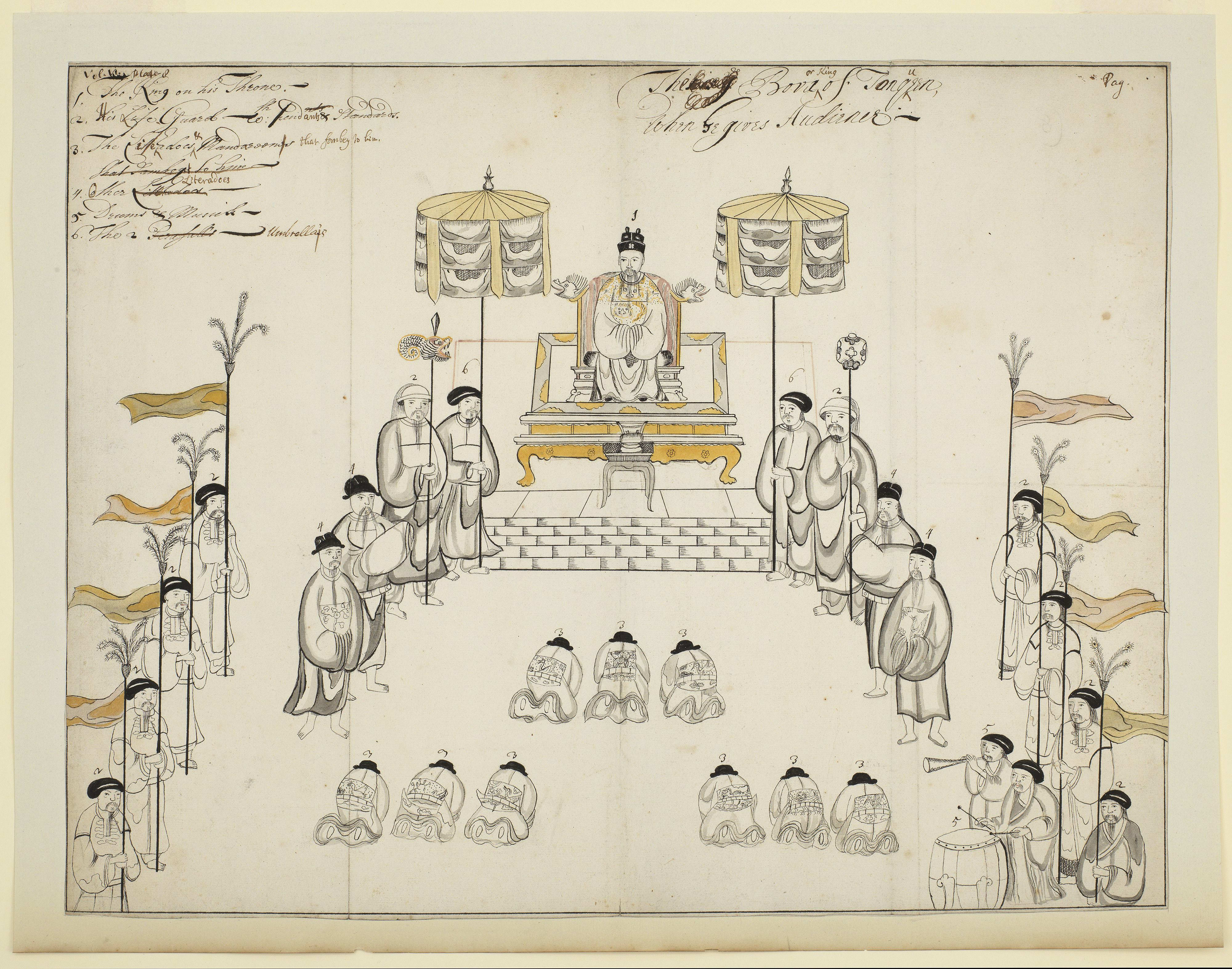
Emperor Le hy Tong on throne

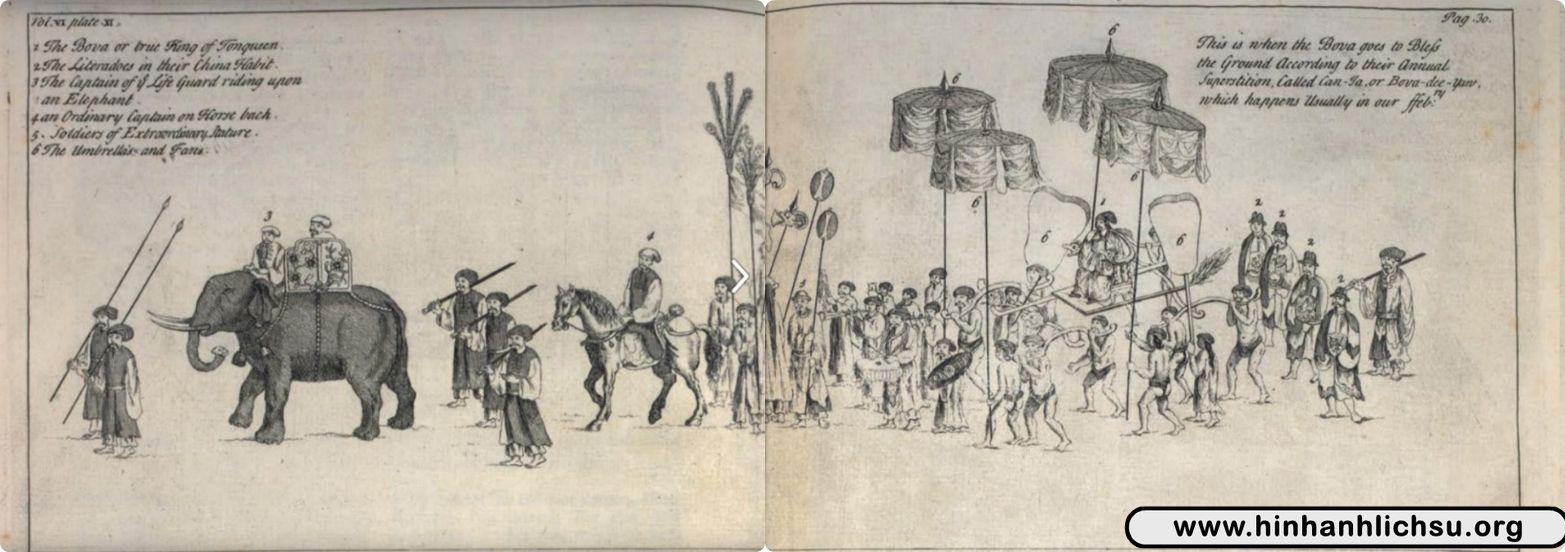
Painting depicting the procession of Emperor Lê Hy Tông

Lê Hy Tông's birth name is Lê Duy Hiệp (黎維祫) or Lê Duy Cáp (黎維祫), courtesy name Duy Thịnh (維𥘺). He was born in 1663 and reigned from 1675 to 1705 as emperor, then he was succeeded by his son as Emperor and reigned in 1705–1716 as the Retired Emperor. He was the figurehead king under the power of lord Trịnh Căn who ruled in 1682–1709.

His reign was said to be the prosper period in the Revival Lê dynasty.

== Family ==
He had issue, including two sons : Lê Duy Đường and Lê Duy Chúc.

Preceded by Lê Gia Tông	Emperor of Vietnam; 1675–1705	Succeeded by Lê Dụ Tông
