= Lê Thuần Tông =

Lê Thuần Tông 黎純宗
- Emperor of Đại Việt

Emperor of Revival Lê dynasty
- Reign: 1732–1735
- Predecessor: Lê Duy Phường
- Successor: Lê Ý Tông
- Regent: Trịnh Giang
- Born: 16 March 1699; Đông Kinh, Đại Việt
- Died: 5 June 1735 (aged 36); Đông Kinh, Đại Việt
Names
- Lê Duy Tường (黎維祥)
Era name and dates
- Long Đức (龍德): 1732–1735
Posthumous name
- Giản Hoàng đế (簡皇帝)
Temple name
- Thuần Tông (純宗)
- House: Revival Lê dynasty
- Father: Lê Dụ Tông

Lê Thuần Tông (chữ Hán: 黎純宗, 16 March 1699 – 5 June 1735) birth name Lê Duy Tường (黎維祥, 黎維祜) was the thirteenth and fourth-last emperor of the Vietnamese Lê dynasty under the domination of the Trịnh lords. He reigned from 1732 to 1735 and was succeeded by Lê Ý Tông.

Preceded by Hôn-đức Duke	Emperor of Vietnam; 1732–1735	Succeeded by Lê Ý Tông
