= Lê Duy Phường =

Lê Duy Phường 黎維祊
- Emperor of Đại Việt

Emperor of the Revival Lê dynasty
- Reign: 1729–1732
- Predecessor: Lê Dụ Tông
- Successor: Lê Thuần Tông
- Regent: Trịnh Cương (1729); Trịnh Giang (1729–1732)
- Born: 1709; Đông Kinh, Đại Việt
- Died: September 1735 (aged 25–26); Đông Kinh, Đại Việt
- Burial: Thanh Trì village (青池鄉), Kim Lũ commune (果盛陵), Đông Kinh, Đại Việt
- Spouse: Trịnh Thị
Names
- Lê Duy Phường (黎維祊)
Era dates
- Vĩnh Khánh (永慶)
Posthumous name
- Hôn Đức công (昏德公)
- House: Revival Lê dynasty
- Father: Lê Dụ Tông
- Mother: Trịnh Thị Ngọc Trang

Lê Duy Phường (黎維祊, 1709–1735) was the twelfth and fifth-last emperor of the Vietnamese Lê dynasty. He was imprisoned shortly after his reign began and reigned under arrest from 1729 to 1732 until he was murdered by Trịnh Giang, and was succeeded by his older brother, Lê Thuần Tông.

Preceded by Lê Dụ Tông	Emperor of Vietnam; 1729–1732	Succeeded by Lê Thuần Tông
