= Lê Dụ Tông =

Lê Dụ Tông 黎裕宗
- Emperor of Annam
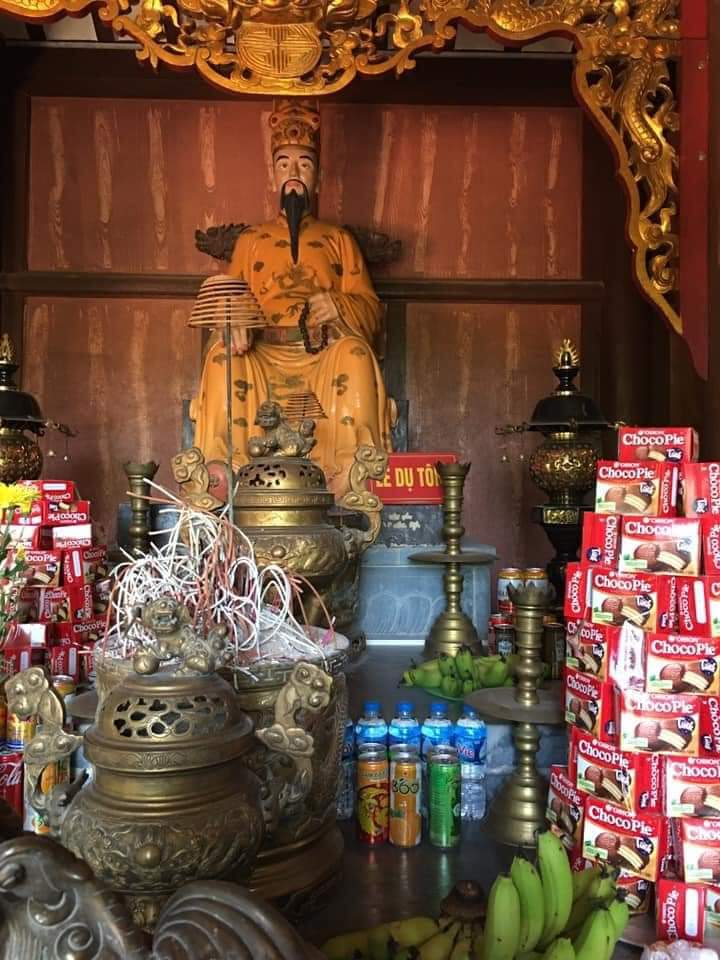
- Statue of Emperor Lê Dụ Tông in the royal temple.

Emperor of the Revival Lê Dynasty
- Reign: 1705–1729
- Predecessor: Lê Hy Tông
- Successor: Lê Duy Phường
- Regent: Trịnh Căn (1705–1709); Trịnh Cương (1709–1729)

Retired Emperor of Revival Lê dynasty
- Reign: 1729–1731
- Born: 1679; Đông Kinh, An Nam
- Died: 27 February 1731 (aged 51–52); Đông Kinh, An Nam
- Burial: Cổ Đô Tomb (古都陵)
Names
- Lê Duy Đường (黎維禟)
Era name and dates
- Vĩnh Thịnh (永盛): 1706-1719; Bảo Thái (保泰): 1720-1729
Posthumous name
- Thuần Chính Huy Nhu Ôn Giản Từ Tường Khoan Huệ Tôn Mẫu Hòa hoàng đế (純正徽柔溫簡慈祥寬惠遜敏和皇帝)
Temple name
- Dụ Tông (裕宗)
- Dynasty: House of Lê
- Father: Lê Hy Tông
- Mother: Nguyễn Thị Ngọc Đệ

Lê Dụ Tông (Hán Nôm : 黎裕宗, 1679 – 27 February 1731), born Lê Duy Đường (黎維禟) was an emperor of Vietnam, the 22nd emperor of the Later Lê dynasty.

== Biography ==
Crown Prince Lê Duy Đường reigned as emperor from 1705 to 1729 (24 years), the first ten years of which his father Lê Hy Tông was alive and elevated in semi-retirement to Retired Emperor (Vietnamese: Thái thượng hoàng). He was succeeded by Lê Duy Phường, also known as the second emperor to carry the title as Hôn Đức Công (means "degraded morality"). (Note: Hoàn táng thi hài vua Lê Dụ Tông : Kỷ yếu Hội đồng họ Lê Việt Nam – 2010 Process ceremony of digging and re-burying corpse of the King Lê Dụ Tông in Thanh Hóa Province, Vietnam.)

== Relatives ==
Parents

- Father : Emperor Lê Hy Tông (real name Lê Duy Hiệp).
- Mother : Nguyễn Thị Ngọc Đệ (initial title "Cung Nghi Chương empress", then "Ôn Từ imperial dowager-empress").

Spouses

- Thuần Chính Hòa empress Trịnh Thị Ngọc Trang (正宫皇后 郑氏玉欉), the first of Thì duke Trịnh Nhuận (son of Định Nam prince Trịnh Căn). She gave birth of Lê Phế Đế.
- Trang Từ imperial dowager-empress Trần Thị (Note: Her name is unknown by the historical documents.), mother of Emperor Lê Thuần Tông.
- Hiến Từ imperial dowager-empress Nguyễn Thị, mother of Emperor Lê Ý Tông.

Children

He had five sons. They are Lê Duy Phường, Lê Duy Mật, Lê Duy Quý, Lê Thuần Tông and Lê Ý Tông.

== Notes and references ==
=== References ===
Preceded by Lê Hy Tông	Emperor of Vietnam; 1705–1729	Succeeded by Lê Duy Phường
