= Trịnh Cương =

Trịnh Cương 鄭棡
- Trịnh lords Lord of Tonkin
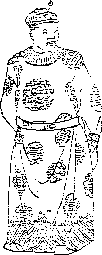

Trịnh lords
- Reign: 1709–1729
- Predecessor: Trịnh Căn
- Successor: Trịnh Giang
- Born: 9 July 1686; Đông Kinh, North Vietnam
- Died: 20 December 1729 (aged 43); Đông Kinh, North Vietnam
- Spouse: Nguyễn Thị Ngọc Phụng; Phạm Thị Ngọc Quyền; Ngô Thị Ngọc Uyên; Trương Thị Ngọc Trong
- Issue: Trịnh Giang; Trịnh Doanh; More sons and daughters
Names
- Trịnh Cương (鄭棡)
Regnal name
- An Đô Vương (安都王)
Posthumous name
- Nhân Vương (仁王)
Temple name
- Hi Tổ (禧祖)
- House: Trịnh Lords
- Father: Trịnh Bính
- Mother: Trương Thị Ngọc Chử; Nguyễn Thị Cảo (step-mother)
- Religion: Buddhism

Trịnh Cương (chữ Hán: 鄭棡; 9 July 1686 – 20 December 1729) was the lord who ruled Tonkin from 1709 to 1729 (his title as ruler was An Đô Vương). Trịnh Cương was born to Trịnh Bính, a grandson of the former lord Trịnh Căn. He belonged to the line of Trịnh lords who had ruled parts of Vietnam since 1545. Like his great-grandfather and predecessor, Trịnh Căn, his reign was mostly devoted to administrative reforms.

- Trịnh Cương
- Vietnamese alphabet: Trịnh Cương
- Chữ Hán: 鄭棡

== Biography ==
Trịnh Cương ruled Việt Nam during a time of external peace but growing internal strife. He enacted many governmental reforms in both financial matters and judicial rules. His main concern was the growing problem of landless peasants. Unlike the Nguyễn lords who were constantly expanding their territory south, the Trịnh lords had little room for expansion. Hence, the land supply was essentially fixed but the population kept growing.

Trịnh Cương tried various legislative means to solve the problem. He tried to limit private land holdings. He tried to redistribute the communal fields of the small villages. Nothing really worked and the problem became very serious over the succeeding decades. According to historian R. H. Bruce Lockhart, the governmental reforms enacted by Trịnh Cương and his great-grandfather, Trịnh Căn, made the government more effective but, they also made the government more of a burden to the people. This had the effect of increasing the hatred felt by the people towards the Trịnh rulers in Hanoi.

Trịnh Cương passed an edict forbidding people to practice Christianity in 1712. Like previous efforts to suppress Christianity, this had little real effect in Vietnam. However, he tried to offer the people an alternative, and he had many Buddhist pagodas constructed during his rule.

As far as the Lê dynasty was concerned, the emperor, Lê Dụ Tông, ruled throughout Trịnh Cương's lifetime. The two men died within a few months of each other in 1729.

== Sources ==
- Encyclopedia of Asian History, Volume 4. 1988. Charles Scribner's Sons, New York.
- Annam and its Minor Currency Chapter 16 (downloaded May 2006)

== See also ==
- Trịnh lords
- Lê dynasty

Vietnamese royalty
Preceded by Trịnh Căn	Trịnh lords Lord of Tonkin; 1709-1729	Succeeded by Trịnh Giang
