= Trịnh Căn =

Trịnh Căn 鄭根
- Trịnh lords Lord of Tonkin
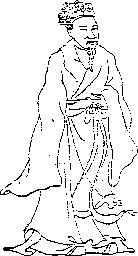

Trịnh Lords
- Reign: 1682–1709
- Predecessor: Trịnh Tạc
- Successor: Trịnh Cương
- Born: 18 July 1633; Đông Kinh, North Vietnam
- Died: 17 June 1709 (aged 75); Đông Kinh, North Vietnam
- Spouse: Nguyễn Thị Ngọc Phụng; Phạm Thị Ngọc Quyền; Ngô Thị Ngọc Uyên
- Issue: Trịnh Vịnh more sons and daughters
Names
- Trịnh Căn (鄭根)
Regnal name
- Định Nam Vương (定南王)
Posthumous name
- Khang Vương (康王)
Temple name
- Chiêu Tổ (昭祖)
- House: Trịnh Lords
- Father: Trịnh Tạc
- Mother: Vũ Thị Ngọc Lễ
- Religion: Buddhism

Trịnh Căn (chữ Hán: 鄭根; 18 July 1633 – 17 June 1709) ruled northern Vietnam from 1682 to 1709 (he ruled with the title Định Vương).

Trịnh Căn was one of the Trịnh lords who ruled Vietnam. With the Trịnh–Nguyễn War ended, his reign was mostly devoted to administrative reforms.

Trịnh Căn, the son of Trịnh Tạc, ruled Vietnam during a time of peace and general prosperity. He devoted his time to administrative affairs. One of his improvements was to force all government officials to take examinations in order to promote honesty and to remove incapable civil servants. He also reformed the laws and punishments; under Trịnh Căn mutilation was no longer a punishment for crimes, and public gambling was prohibited.

In 1694, the last effective leader of the Lān Xāng federation died. The resulting succession battle caused the federation to collapse. The Vietnamese sent an army into Laos to assert their authority in the area in 1694. After 10 years of conflict with other Lao forces and with Ayutthaya forces under king Phetracha, three weak Lao kingdoms emerged, each of which paid tribute to both Vietnam and Ayutthaya (modern day Thailand). (Note: it is possible, but less likely, that it was a Nguyễn army under Nguyễn Phúc Chu which intervened in Laos).

As far as the Lê dynasty was concerned, the emperor, Lê Hy Tông, was forced to abdicate the throne in 1706. He was replaced by Lê Du Tông.

== See also ==
- Lê dynasty
- List of Vietnamese dynasties

== Sources ==
- Annam and its Minor Currency Chapter 16 (downloaded May 2006)
- A Glimpse of Vietnam's History (downloaded May 2006)

Vietnamese royalty
Preceded by Trịnh Tạc	Trịnh lords Lord of Tonkin; 1682–1709	Succeeded by Trịnh Cương
