= Trịnh Giang =

Trịnh Giang 鄭杠
- Trịnh lords Lord of Tonkin
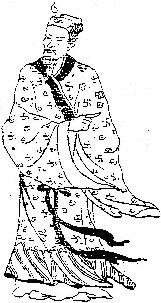

Trịnh lords
- Reign: 1729–1740
- Predecessor: Trịnh Cương
- Successor: Trịnh Doanh
- Born: 14 October 1711; Đông Kinh, North Vietnam
- Died: 30 December 1762 (aged 51); Đông Kinh, North Vietnam
- Spouse: ?
- Issue: Trịnh Bồng; More sons and daughters
Names
- Trịnh Giang (鄭杠)
Regnal name
- Uy Nam Vương (威南王)
Posthumous name
- Thuận Vương (順王)
Temple name
- Dụ Tổ (裕祖)
- House: Trịnh lords
- Father: Trịnh Cương
- Mother: Vũ Thị Ngọc Nguyên
- Religion: Buddhism

Trịnh Giang (chữ Hán: 鄭杠; 14 October 1711 – 30 December 1762) ruled northern Vietnam (Tonkin) from 1729 to 1740. His title as ruling lord (chua) was Uy Nam Vương. He was one of the Trịnh Lords who ruled Vietnam. He was a bad ruler, being wasteful, inept, and callous.

== History ==
Trịnh Giang was the son of his predecessor Trịnh Cương. He is considered one of the worst of the Trịnh lords. During his years in power, he spent money on luxuries and did little about the growing problem of landless peasants in the countryside. Also, a series of natural disasters struck, floods caused ruin for many villages and yet Trịnh Giang did nothing to relieve the suffering. Instead, he obtained (through rich gifts) a new title from the Yongzheng Emperor of China, Supreme King of Annam (Vietnamese: An Nam Thuong Vuong). This foolish action provoked a rash of revolts as the people felt he was usurping the title of the Lê Emperor.

By 1737, his government had run out of money and had to put public offices up for sale.

A mandarin could gain a step in rank by the payment of six hundred strings of cash, and the commonest man in the kingdom was able to obtain the highest rank by the payment of two thousand eight hundred strings.

In the midst of revolts and bankruptcy, Trịnh Giang turned the government over to a favored eunuch in 1738. Two years later he was deposed and Trịnh Doanh took over.

As far as the Lê dynasty was concerned, the king, Hôn Đức Công (1729–1732), was imprisoned shortly after assuming the throne and was then murdered after three years. He was replaced by Lê Thuần Tông (1732–1735) who was in turn replaced by Lê Ý Tông (1735–1740).

== See also ==
- List of Vietnamese dynasties

== Sources ==
- Encyclopedia of Asian History, Volume 4. 1988. Charles Scribner's Sons, New York.
- Annam and its Minor Currency Chapter 16 (downloaded May 2006)

Vietnamese royalty
Preceded by Trịnh Cương	Trịnh lords Lord of Tonkin; 1729-1740	Succeeded by Trịnh Doanh
