= Khâm định Việt sử Thông giám cương mục =

1884 literary work on Vietnamese history

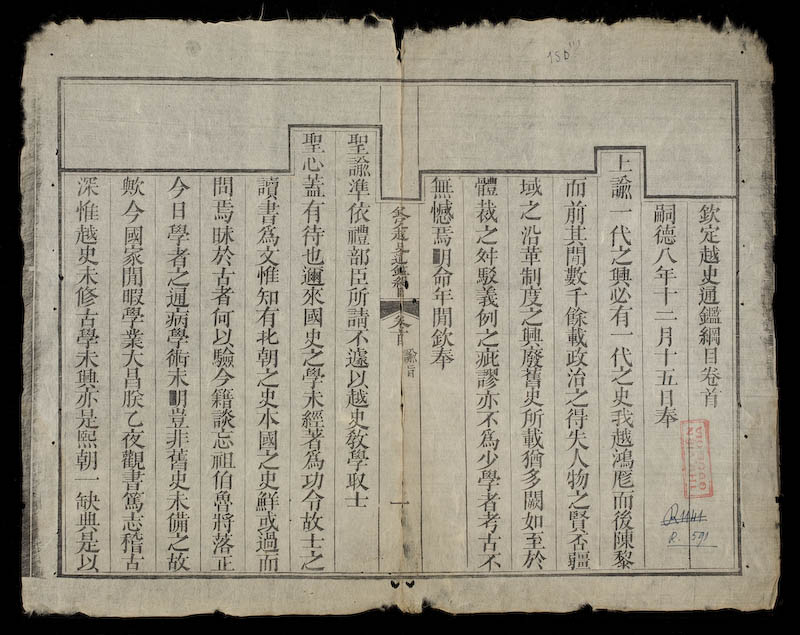
- Khâm định Việt sử Thông giám cương mục
- Original title: 欽定越史通鑑綱目
- Language: Văn ngôn
- Subject: History of Vietnam
- Genre: Historiography
- Publisher: Nguyễn dynasty
- Publication date: 1884
- Publication place: Đại Nam

The Khâm định Việt sử Thông giám cương mục (chữ Hán: 欽定越史通鑑綱目, lit. "The Imperially Ordered Annotated Text Completely Reflecting the History of Viet") is the history of Vietnam commissioned by the Emperor Tự Đức of the Nguyễn dynasty. It was written in Văn ngôn (which is a form of Classical Chinese used in Vietnam).

== Composition history and modifications from 1856 until 1884 ==
Emperor Tự Đức's interest in history led him to order the creation of this book in 1856. He appointed Phan Thanh Giản the chief editor. It was finished in 1859 and additionally annotated by the Emperor himself. After several modifications in 1871, 1872, 1876, and 1878, the book was finally published in 1884.

== Translation ==
Khâm định Việt sử Thông giám cương mục was translated into the Vietnamese alphabet in 1960. It can now be found online in the National Library of Vietnam.

== Contents ==
Khâm định Việt sử Thông giám cương mục contains 53 volumes.

Contents of the Khâm định Việt sử Thông giám cương mục
Prequel Records (Tiền biên, 前編)
Volume No. (Quyển)	start year	end year	Total years
1	Hùng Vương 雄王	1st year of Triệu Ai Vương (112 BC) 趙哀王元年	
2	1st year of Triệu Vương Kiến Đức (111 BC) 趙王建德元年	12th year of Kiến An, Hán Hiến Đế (207) 屬漢獻帝 建安十二年	
3	15th year of Kiến An, Hán Hiến Đế (210) 屬漢獻帝 建安十五年	12th year of Phổ Thông, Lương Vũ Đế (523) 屬梁武帝 普通四年	
4	7th year of Đại Đồng, Lương Vũ Đế (541) 屬梁武帝 大同七年	2nd year of Hàm Thông, Đường Ý Tông (861) 屬唐懿宗 咸通二年	321
5	3rd year of Hàm Thông, Đường Ý Tông (862) 屬唐懿宗 咸通三年	5th year of Càn Đức, Tống Thái Tổ (967) 當宋太祖 乾德五年	106
Principal Records (Chính biên, 正編)
Volume No. (Quyển)	start year	end year	Total years
1	Mậu Thìn, 1st year of Đinh Tiên Hoàng (968) 戊辰 丁先皇元年	Đinh Mùi, 14th year of Ứng Thiên, Lê Đế Long Đĩnh (1007) 丁未 黎帝龍鋌 應天十四年	40
2	Mậu Thân, 1st year of Cảnh Thụy, Lê Đế Long Đĩnh (1008) 戊申 黎帝龍鋌 景瑞元年	Kỷ Mão, 1st year of Càn Phù Hữu Đạo, Lý Thái Tông (1039) 己卯 李太宗 乾符有道元年	32
3	Canh Thìn, 2nd year of Càn Phù Hữu Đạo, Lý Thái Tông (1040) 庚辰 李太宗 乾符有道二年	Tân Mùi, 1st year of Quảng Hữu, Lý Nhân Tông (1091) 辛未 李仁宗 廣祐元年	52
4	Nhâm Thân, 1st year of Hội Phong, Lý Nhân Tông (1092) 壬申 李仁宗 會豐元年	Kỷ Tỵ, 10th year of Đại Định, Lý Anh Tông (1149) 己巳 李英宗 大定十年	58
5	Canh Ngọ, 11th year of Đại Định, Lý Anh Tông (1150) 庚午 李英宗 大定十一年	Ất Dậu, 2nd year of Thiên Chương Hữu Đạo, Lý Chiêu Hoàng (1225) 乙酉 李昭皇 天彰有道二年	76
6	Bính Tuất, 2nd year of Kiến Trung, Trần Thái Tông (1226) 丙戌 陳太宗 建中二年	Mậu Ngọ, 8th year of Nguyên Phong, Trần Thái Tông (1258) 戊午 陳太宗 元豐八年	33
7	Kỷ Mùi, 2nd year of Thiệu Long, Trần Thánh Tông (1259) 己未 陳聖宗 紹隆二年	Bính Tuất, 2nd year of Trùng Hưng, Trần Nhân Tông (1286) 丙戌 陳仁宗 重興二年	28
8	Đinh Hợi, 3rd year of Trùng Hưng, Trần Nhân Tông (1287) 丁亥 陳仁宗 重興三年	Đinh Mùi, 15th year Hưng Long, Trần Anh Tông (1307) 丁未 陳英宗 興隆十五年	21
9	Mậu Thân, 16th year of Hưng Long, Trần Anh Tông (1308) 戊申 陳英宗 興隆十六年	Kỷ Sửu, 9th year of Thiệu Phong, Trần Dụ Tông (1349) 己丑 陳裕宗 紹豐九年	42
10	Canh Dần, 10th year of Thiệu Phong, Trần Dụ Tông (1350) 庚寅 陳裕宗 紹豐十年	Quý Hợi, 7th year of Xương Phù, Trần Đế Hiện (1383) 癸亥 陳帝晛 昌符七年	34
11	Giáp Tý, 8th year of Xương Phù, Trần Đế Hiện (1384) 甲子 陳帝晛 昌符八年	Nhâm Ngọ, 2rd year of Thiệu Thành, Hồ Hán Thương (1402) 壬午 胡漢蒼 紹成二年	19
12	Quý Mùi, 1st year of Khai Đại, Hồ Hán Thương (1403) 癸未 胡漢蒼 開大元年	Đinh Dậu, 15th year of Vĩnh Lạc, Ming dynasty (1417) 丁酉 屬明 永樂 十五年	15
13	Mậu Tuất, 1st year of Bình Định Vương Lê Lợi (1418) 戊戌 平定王黎利 元年	Bính Ngọ, 9th year of Bình Định Vương Lê Lợi (1426) 丙午 平定王黎利 九年	9
14	Đinh Mùi, January, 10th year of Bình Định Vương Lê Lợi (1427) 丁未 平定王黎利 十年 正月	Đinh Mùi, October, 10th year of Bình Định Vương Lê Lợi (1427) 丁未 平定王黎利 十年 十二月	1
15	Mậu Thân, 1st year of Thuận Thiên, Lê Thái Tổ (1428) 戊申 黎太祖 順天元年	Quý Sửu, 6th year of Thuận Thiên, Lê Thái Tổ (1433) 癸丑 黎太祖 順天六年	6
16	Giáp Dần, 1st year of Thiệu Bình, Lê Thái Tông (1434) 甲寅 黎太宗 紹平元年	Bính Thìn, 3rd year of Thiệu Bình, Lê Thái Tông (1436) 丙辰 黎太宗 紹平三年	3
17	Đinh Tỵ, 4th year of Thiệu Bình, Lê Thái Tông (1437) 丁巳 黎太宗 紹平四年	Đinh Mão, 5th year of Thái Hòa, Lê Nhân Tông (1448) 丁卯 黎仁宗 太和五年	11
18	Mậu Thìn, 6th year of Thái Hòa, Lê Nhân Tông (1448) 戊辰 黎仁宗 太和六年	Kỷ Mão, 6th year of Diên Ninh, Lê Nhân Tông (1459) 己卯 黎仁宗 延寧六年	12
19	Canh Thìn, 1st year of Quang Thuận, Lê Thánh Tông (1460) 庚辰 黎聖宗 光順元年	Ất Dậu, 6th year of Quang Thuận, Lê Thánh Tông (1465) 乙酉 黎聖宗 光順六年	6
20	Bính Tuất, 7th year of Quang Thuận, Lê Thánh Tông (1466) 丙戌 黎聖宗 光順七年	Đinh Hợi, autumn, September, 8th year of Quang Thuận, Lê Thánh Tông (1467) 丁亥 黎聖宗 光順八年 秋 九月	1 year more
21	Đinh Hợi, winter, October, 8th year of Quang Thuận, Lê Thánh Tông (1467) 丁亥 黎聖宗 光順八年 冬 十月	Canh Dần, 1st year of Hồng Đức, Lê Thánh Tông (1470) 庚寅 黎聖宗 洪德元年	3 years more
22	Tân Mão, 2nd year of Hồng Đức, Lê Thánh Tông (1471) 癸卯 黎聖宗 洪德二年	Giáp Ngọ, 5th year of Hồng Đức, Lê Thánh Tông (1474) 甲午 黎聖宗 洪德五年	4
23	Ất Mùi, 6th year of Hồng Đức, Lê Thánh Tông (1475) 乙未 黎聖宗 洪德六年	Giáp Thìn, 15th year of Hồng Đức, Lê Thánh Tông (1484) 甲辰 黎聖宗 洪德十五年	10
24	Ất Tỵ, 16th year of Hồng Đức, Lê Thánh Tông (1485) 乙巳 黎聖宗 洪德十六年	Kỷ Mùi, 2nd year of Cảnh Thống, Lê Hiến Tông (1499) 己未 黎憲宗 景統二年	15
25	Canh Thân, 3rd year of Cảnh Thống, Lê Hiến Tông (1500) 庚申 黎憲宗 景統三年	Kỷ Tỵ, 5th year of Đoan Khánh, Lê Uy Mục Đế (1509) 己巳 黎威穆帝 端慶五年	10
26	Canh Ngọ, 2nd year of Hồng Thuận, Lê Tương Dực Đế (1510) 庚午 黎襄翼帝 洪順二年	Kỷ Mão, 4th year of Quang Thiệu, Lê Chiêu Tông (1519) 己卯 黎昭宗 光紹四年	10
27	Canh Thìn, 5th year of Quang Thiệu, Lê Chiêu Tông (1520) 庚辰 黎昭宗 光紹五年	Mậu Thân, 16th year of Nguyên Hòa, Lê Trang Tông (1548) 戊申 黎莊宗 元和十六年	29
28	Kỷ Dậu, 1st year of Thuận Bình, Lê Trung Tông (1549) 己酉 黎中宗 順平元年	Nhâm Thân, 1st year of Hồng Phúc, Lê Anh Tông (1572) 壬申 黎英宗 洪福元年	24
29	Quý Dậu, 2nd year of Hồng Phúc, Lê Anh Tông (1573) 癸酉 黎英宗 洪福二年	Nhâm Thìn, 15th year of Quang Hưng, Lê Thế Tông (1592) 壬辰 黎世宗 光興十五年	20
30	Quý Tỵ, 16th year of Quang Hưng, Lê Thế Tông (1593) 癸巳 黎世宗 光興十六年	Kỷ Hợi, 22nd year of Quang Hưng, Lê Thế Tông (1599) 己亥 黎世宗 光興二十二年	7
31	Canh Tý, 1st year of Thận Đức, Lê Kính Tông (1600) 庚子 黎敬宗 慎德元年	Quý Mùi, 9th year of Dương Hòa, Lê Thần Tông (1643) 癸未 黎神宗 陽和九年	44
32	Canh Thân, 2nd year of Phúc Thái, Lê Chân Tông (1644) 甲申 黎真宗 福泰二年	Nhâm Dần, 1st year of Vạn Khánh, Lê Thần Tông (1662) 壬寅 黎神宗 萬慶元年	19
33	Quý Mão, 1st year of Cảnh Trị, Lê Huyền Tông (1663) 癸卯 黎玄宗 景治元年	Ất Mão, 2nd year of Đức Nguyên, Lê Gia Tông (1675) 乙卯 黎嘉宗 德元二年	13
34	Bính Thìn, 2nd year of Vĩnh Trị, Lê Hy Tông (1676) 丙辰 黎熙宗 永治元年	Ất Dậu, 26th year of Chính Hòa, Lê Hy Tông (1705) 乙酉 黎熙宗 正和二十六年	30
35	Bính Tuất, 2nd year of Vĩnh Thịnh, Lê Dụ Tông (1706) 丙戌 黎裕宗 永盛二年	Tân Sửu, 2nd year of Bảo Thái, Lê Dụ Tông (1721) 辛丑 黎裕宗 保泰二年	16
36	Nhâm Dần, 3rd year of Bảo Thái, Lê Dụ Tông (1722) 壬寅 黎裕宗 保泰三年	Đinh Mùi, 8th year of Bảo Thái, Lê Dụ Tông (1727) 丁未 黎裕宗 保泰八年	6
37	Mậu Thân, 9th year of Bảo Thái, Lê Dụ Tông (1728) 戊申 黎裕宗 保泰九年	Ất Mão, 4th year of Long Đức, Lê Thuần Tông (1735) 乙卯 黎純宗 龍德四年	8
38	Bính Thìn, 2nd year of Vĩnh Hữu, Lê Ý Tông (1736) 丙辰 黎懿宗 永佑二年	Canh Thân, 6th year of Vĩnh Hữu, Lê Ý Tông (1740) 庚申 黎懿宗 永佑六年	5
39	Tân Dậu, 2nd year of Cảnh Hưng, Lê Hiển Tông (1741) 辛酉 黎顯宗 景興二年	Quý Hợi, 4th year of Cảnh Hưng, Lê Hiển Tông (1743) 癸亥 黎顯宗 景興四年	3
40	Giáp Tý, 5th year of Cảnh Hưng, Lê Hiển Tông (1744) 甲子 黎顯宗 景興五年	Kỷ Tỵ, 10th year of Cảnh Hưng, Lê Hiển Tông (1749) 己巳 黎顯宗 景興十年	6
41	Canh Ngọ, 11th year of Cảnh Hưng, Lê Hiển Tông (1750) 庚午 黎顯宗 景興十一年	Bính Tý, 17th year of Cảnh Hưng, Lê Hiển Tông (1756) 丙子 黎顯宗 景興十七年	7
42	Đinh Sửu, 18th year of Cảnh Hưng, Lê Hiển Tông (1757) 丁丑 黎顯宗 景興十八年	Bính Tuất, 27th year of Cảnh Hưng, Lê Hiển Tông (1766) 丙戌 黎顯宗 景興二十七年	10
43	Đinh Hợi, 28th year of Cảnh Hưng, Lê Hiển Tông (1767) 丁亥 黎顯宗 景興二十八年	Tân Mão, 32nd year of Cảnh Hưng, Lê Hiển Tông (1771) 辛卯 黎顯宗 景興三十二年	5
44	Nhâm Thìn, 33rd year of Cảnh Hưng, Lê Hiển Tông (1772) 壬辰 黎顯宗 景興三十三年	Bính Thân, 37th year of Cảnh Hưng, Lê Hiển Tông (1776) 丙申 黎顯宗 景興三十七年	5
45	Đinh Dậu, 38th year of Cảnh Hưng, Lê Hiển Tông (1777) 丁酉 黎顯宗 景興三十八年	Nhâm Dần, 43rd year of Cảnh Hưng, Lê Hiển Tông (1782) 壬寅 黎顯宗 景興四十三年	6
46	Quý Mão, 44th year of Cảnh Hưng, Lê Hiển Tông (1783) 癸卯 黎顯宗 景興四十四年	Bính Ngọ, 47th year of Cảnh Hưng, Lê Hiển Tông (1786) 丙午 黎顯宗 景興四十七年	4
47	Đinh Mùi, 1st year of Chiêu Thống, Lê Mẫn Đế (1787) 丁未 黎愍帝 昭統元年	Kỷ Dậu, 3rd year of Chiêu Thống, Lê Mẫn Đế (1789) 己酉 黎愍帝 昭統三年	3
