= 1671 =

1671 in various calendars
- Gregorian calendar: 1671; MDCLXXI
- Ab urbe condita: 2424
- Armenian calendar: 1120; ԹՎ ՌՃԻ
- Assyrian calendar: 6421
- Balinese saka calendar: 1592–1593
- Bengali calendar: 1077–1078
- Berber calendar: 2621
- English Regnal year: 22 Cha. 2 – 23 Cha. 2
- Buddhist calendar: 2215
- Burmese calendar: 1033
- Byzantine calendar: 7179–7180
- Chinese calendar: 庚戌年 (Metal Dog); 4368 or 4161 — to — 辛亥年 (Metal Pig); 4369 or 4162
- Coptic calendar: 1387–1388
- Discordian calendar: 2837
- Ethiopian calendar: 1663–1664
- Hebrew calendar: 5431–5432
- Hindu calendars
- Vikram Samvat: 1727–1728
- Shaka Samvat: 1592–1593
- Kali Yuga: 4771–4772
- Holocene calendar: 11671
- Igbo calendar: 671–672
- Iranian calendar: 1049–1050
- Islamic calendar: 1081–1082
- Japanese calendar: Kanbun 11 (寛文１１年)
- Javanese calendar: 1593–1594
- Julian calendar: Gregorian minus 10 days
- Korean calendar: 4004
- Minguo calendar: 241 before ROC 民前241年
- Nanakshahi calendar: 203
- Thai solar calendar: 2213–2214
- Tibetan calendar: ལྕགས་ཕོ་ཁྱི་ལོ་ (male Iron-Dog); 1797 or 1416 or 644 — to — ལྕགས་མོ་ཕག་ལོ་ (female Iron-Boar); 1798 or 1417 or 645

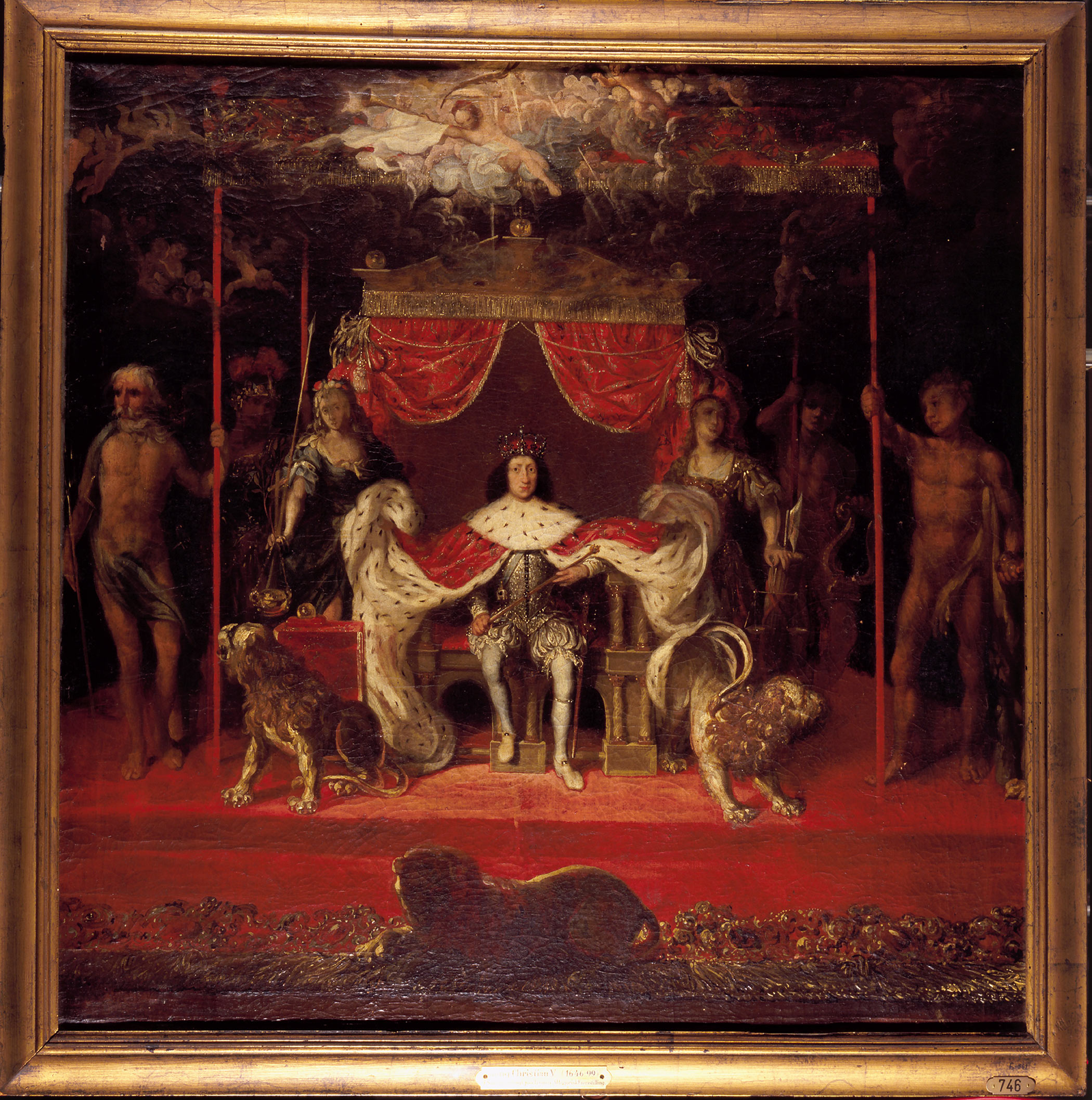
June 7: Christian V is crowned as King of Denmark and of Norway at Frederiksborg Castle.

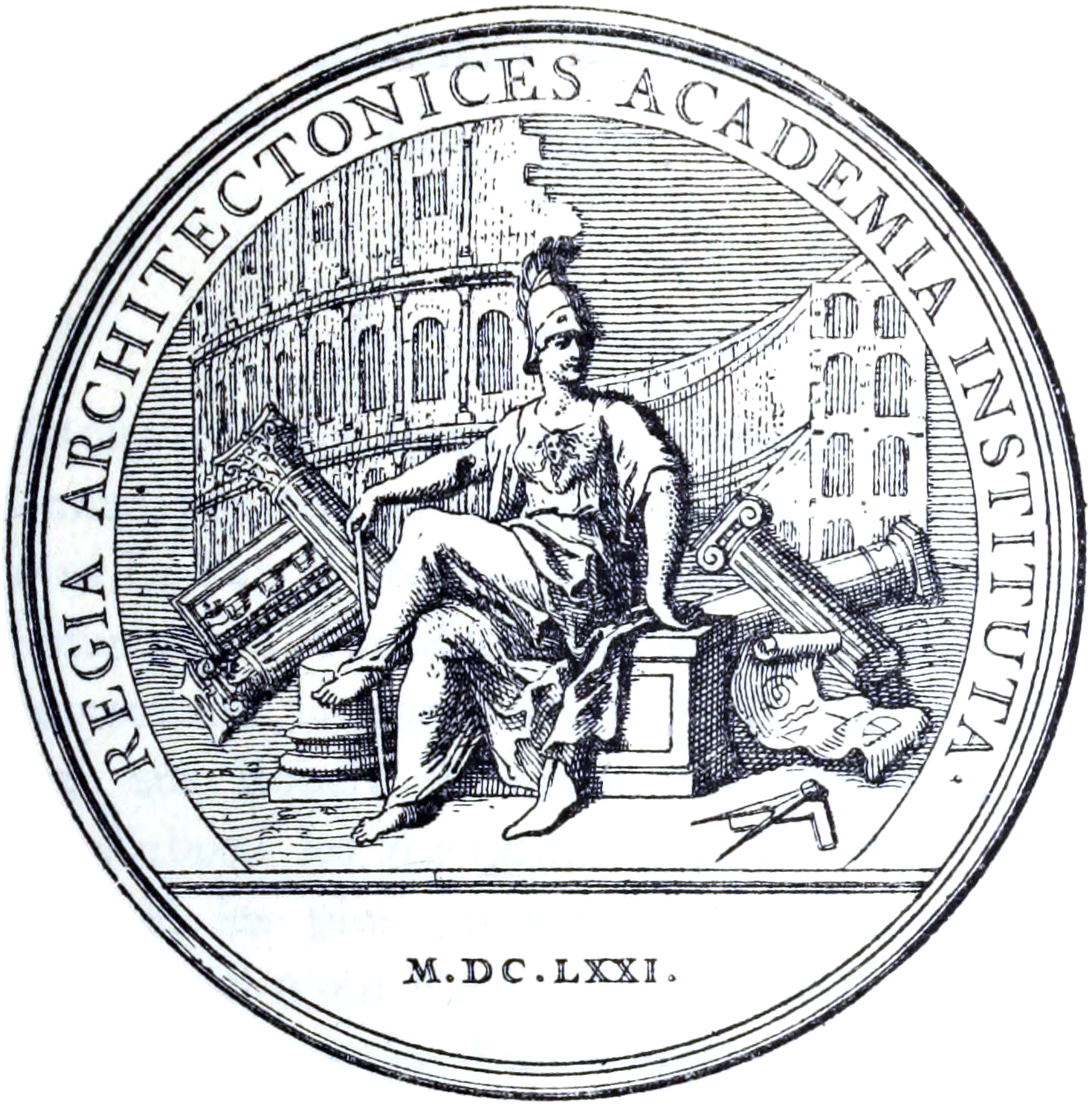
December 30: The Académie royale d'architecture is founded.

1671 (MDCLXXI) was a common year starting on Thursday of the Gregorian calendar and a common year starting on Sunday of the Julian calendar, the 1671st year of the Common Era (CE) and Anno Domini (AD) designations, the 671st year of the 2nd millennium, the 71st year of the 17th century, and the 2nd year of the 1670s decade. As of the start of 1671, the Gregorian calendar was 10 days ahead of the Julian calendar, which remained in localized use until 1923.

== Events ==
=== January–March ===
- January 1 – The Criminal Ordinance of 1670, the first attempt at a uniform code of criminal procedure in France, goes into effect after having been passed on August 26, 1670.
- January 5 – The Battle of Salher is fought in India as the first major confrontation between the Maratha Empire and the Mughal Empire, with the Maratha Army of 40,000 infantry and cavalry under the command of General Prataprao Gujar defeating a larger Mughal force led by General Diler Khan.
- January 17 – The ballet Psyché, with music composed by Jean-Baptiste Lully, premieres before the royal court of King Louis XIV at the Théâtre des Tuileries in Paris.
- January 28 – Henry Morgan's Panama expedition – the city of Nuestra Señora de la Asunción de Panamá, founded more than 150 years earlier at the Isthmus of Panama by Spanish settlers and the first permanent European settlement on the Pacific Ocean, is destroyed by the Welsh pirate Henry Morgan. The last surviving original structures are now part of Panama City, capital of the Central American nation of Panama.
- February 1 – The Tsar Alexis of Russia marries Nataliya Kyrillovna Naryshkina, who gives birth 16 months later to the future Peter the Great.
- February 27 – The Ortenau meteorite lands in Germany.
- March 3 – Pomone, written by Robert Cambert and considered by modern scholars to be the first French opera, is given its first performance. Using innovative costumes, and machinery for special stage effects, the premiere performed by the Académie d'Opéra at the Salle de la Bouteille theater in Paris is a success.
- March 11 – The Danish West India Company, a charter ship company whose operations include human trafficking of African slaves to the Western Hemisphere by its Danish Africa Company subsidiary, is founded.
- March 15 – A tornado kills more than 600 people in the city of Cádiz in Spain.
- March 22 – Sabine baronets title is created in England for John Sabine.
- March 31 – England's Royal Navy launches its first warship to have a frame reinforced by iron bars rather than an all wooden ship, an innovation by naval architect Anthony Deane. The state of the art, 102-gun ship is commissioned on January 18, 1672, as the flagship for Admiral Edward Montagu but is sunk less than five months later in the Battle of Solebay. Iron-framed ships are not attempted again for almost 50 years.
- March – In the Battle of Saraighat in India, fought in mid-March, General Lachit Borphukan of the Ahom kingdom, located in what is now the Indian state of Assam defeats a larger force of Mughal Empire troops on the outskirts of what is now Guwahati.

=== April–June ===
- April 2 – In Rome, Pope Clement X canonizes Rose of Lima, making her the first Catholic saint of the Americas.
- May 9 – Thomas Blood, disguised as a clergyman, attempts to steal the Crown Jewels of the United Kingdom from the Tower of London. He is immediately caught, because he is too drunk to run with the loot. He is later condemned to death, and then mysteriously pardoned and exiled by King Charles II.
- June 7 – The coronation ceremony of Christian V of Denmark-Norway takes place at the Frederiksborg Castle in Hillerød, north of Copenhagen. Christian had assumed the throne on February 9, 1670, upon the death of his father, Frederick III.
- June 22 – The Ottoman Empire declares war on Poland.

=== July–September ===
- July 24 – Awashonks, the female sachem who leads the Sakonnet Indians in what is now the U.S. state of Rhode Island, signs a peace agreement with the English leaders of the neighboring Plymouth Colony (now part of Massachusetts), along with chiefs Totatomet, Tattacommett and Somagaonet.
- August 15 – Jamaica's Governor Thomas Lynch offers a general pardon to pirates who are willing to come under Jamaican jurisdiction.
- September 6 – The Court of King Charles II of England dispatches a letter to the "King of Formosa" (Zheng Jing, ruler of the Kingdom of Tungning) confirming that English ships will be welcome to trade at the "City of Tywan", referring to Taipei on the island of Taiwan.

=== October–December ===
- October 25 – Italian-born French astronomer Giovanni Domenico Cassini discovers Iapetus, the second known moon of the planet Saturn. Christiaan Huygens had discovered the Saturnian moon Titan on March 25, 1655.
- October 30 – The Republic of Venice and the Ottoman Empire sign a treaty delineating the borders between their territories in modern-day Greece, with Venice acknowledging the loss of the island of Crete in the Cretan War.
- November 8 – Dionysius IV, bishop of Larissa, is elected as the Ecumenical Patriarch of Constantinople, leader of the Eastern Orthodox Christians, after Parthenius IV is sent into exile.
- November 9 – The Duke of York's Theatre is opened in London by the players of the Duke's Company, rivals to the "King's Company" at the Theatre Royal, which burns down two months later. The site is now the Dorset Garden Theatre.
- November 18 – In southwest Africa, troops of the Army of Portugal, under the command of Luís Lopes de Sequeira, win the Battle of Pungo Andongo, capturing the fortress capital of the Kingdom of Ndongo after nine months and deposing King Ngola Hari. The kingdom is annexed into the Portuguese colony of Angola.
- November 19 – Lê Gia Tông, age 10, is installed as the figurehead Emperor of Vietnam (a kingdom known as Đại Việt or Annam) by the warlord Trịnh Tạc, after the death, three days earlier, of Lê Huyền Tông. He reigns until his death on April 3, 1675.
- December 7 – The first Seventh Day Baptist church in America is founded with a service on a Saturday at Newport, Rhode Island, by Stephen Mumford and four Sabbatarians who believed that Christian church services should be held on Saturday, the seventh and last day of the week, in keeping with the commandment of remembering the Sabbath.
- December 30 – The Académie royale d'architecture is founded by Louis XIV of France in Paris as the world's first school of architecture.

=== Undated ===
- The first Jewish families settle in Berlin, moving from Vienna at the invitation of Frederick William, Elector of Brandenburg.

== Births ==
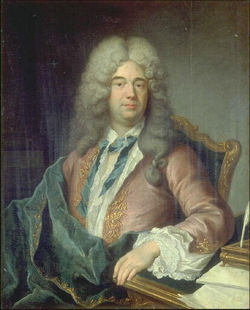
Jean-Baptiste Rousseau

- January 11 – François-Marie, 1st duc de Broglie, French military leader (d. 1745)
- February 26 – Anthony Ashley-Cooper, 3rd Earl of Shaftesbury, English politician and philosopher (d. 1713)
- March 7 – Rob Roy MacGregor, Scottish folk hero (d. 1734)
- April 6 – Jean-Baptiste Rousseau, French poet (d. 1741)
- April 21 – John Law, Scottish economist (d. 1729)
- May 24 – Gian Gastone de' Medici, Grand Duke of Tuscany (d. 1737)
- June 8 – Tomaso Albinoni, Italian composer (d. 1751)
- June 21 – Christian Detlev Reventlow, Danish diplomat and military leader, brother-in-law of king Frederick IV of Denmark (d. 1738)
- July 9 – Margareta von Ascheberg, Swedish land owner, countess and acting regimental colonel (d. 1753)
- July 14 – Jacques d'Allonville, French astronomer and mathematician (d. 1732)
- October 1 – Guido Grandi, Italian mathematician (d. 1742)
- October 11 – King Frederick IV of Denmark (d. 1730)
- November 6 – Colley Cibber, English actor-manager and poet laureate (d. 1757)
- November 15 (bapt.) – Anne Bracegirdle, English actress (d. 1748)

== Deaths ==
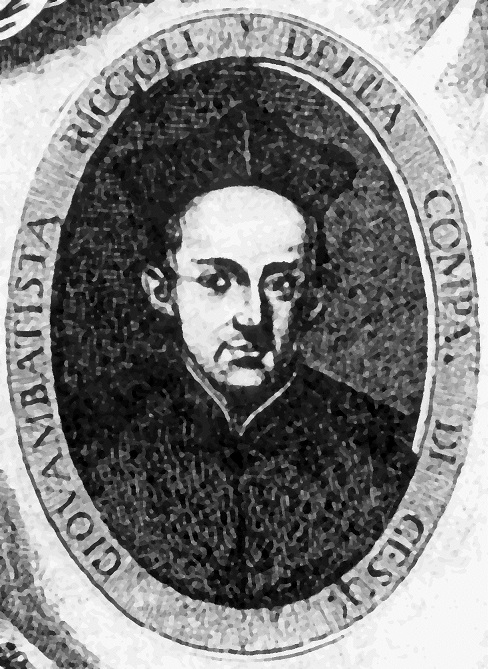
Giovanni Battista Riccioli

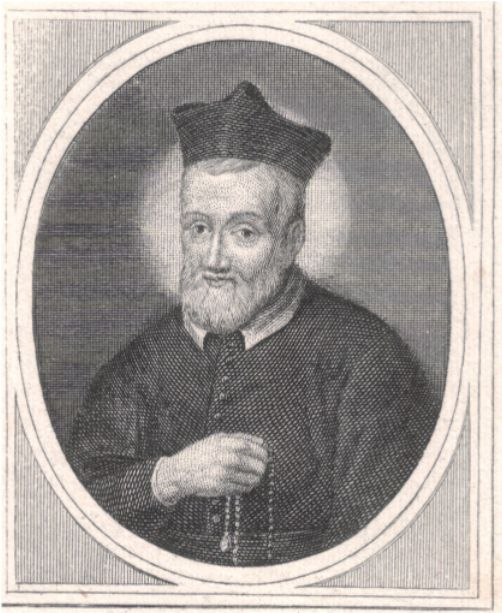
Blessed Antonio Grassi

- January 6 – Dubhaltach Mac Fhirbhisigh (b. 1643)
- January 24 – Philipp, Prince of Hohenzollern-Hechingen (b. 1616)
- January 25 – Henry X, Count of Reuss-Lobenstein, Rector of the University of Leipzig (b. 1621)
- February 18 – John Mennes, English Royal Navy admiral (b. 1599)
- February 22 – Adam Olearius, German scholar (b. 1599)
- February 19 – Tokugawa Yorinobu, Japanese nobleman (b. 1602)
- March 1
  - Marzio Ginetti, Italian Catholic cardinal (b. 1585)
  - Leopold Wilhelm of Baden-Baden, Imperial Field Marshal (b. 1626)
- March 7 – Antonio de la Cerda, 7th Duke of Medinaceli, Grandee of Spain (b. 1607)
- March 15 – Axel Urup, Danish general (b. 1601)
- March 31 – Anne Hyde, wife of the future James II of England (b. 1637)
- April 20 – Daniel Hay du Chastelet de Chambon, French mathematician (b. 1596)
- April 23 – Theodorick Bland of Westover, American politician (b. 1629)
- April 30
  - Petar Zrinski, Croatian Ban (title) and nobleman (b. 1621)
  - Fran Krsto Frankopan, Croatian poet and nobleman (b. 1643)
- May 5 – Edward Montagu, 2nd Earl of Manchester, English politician (b. 1602)
- May 8 – Sébastien Bourdon, French painter and engraver (b. 1616)
- May 12 – Pedro de Villagómez Vivanco, Roman Catholic prelate, Archbishop of Lima, then Bishop of Arequipa (b. 1589)
- May 16 – Sir John Langham, 1st Baronet, English Member of Parliament (b. 1584)
- May 19 – John Scudamore, 1st Viscount Scudamore, English politician and Viscount (b. 1601)
- June 2
  - Edward Leigh, English writer (b. 1602)
  - Sophia Eleonore of Saxony, German duchess (b. 1609)
- June 9 – Sebastian von Rostock, German bishop (b. 1607)
- June 25 – Giovanni Battista Riccioli, Italian astronomer (b. 1598)
- July 4 – Jan Cossiers, Flemish painter (b. 1600)
- July 14 – Méric Casaubon, English classical scholar (b. 1599)
- July 30 – Louis Joseph, Duke of Guise (b. 1650)
- August 3 – Antonio Barberini, Italian Catholic cardinal (b. 1607)
- August 10 – Sir John Evelyn, 1st Baronet, of Godstone, English noble (b. 1633)
- September 1 – Hugues de Lionne, French statesman (b. 1611)
- September 11 – Roshanara Begum, Mughal princess (b. 1617)
- September 19 – Gilbert Ironside the elder, English bishop (b. 1588)
- October 5 – Joachim Ernest, Duke of Schleswig-Holstein-Sonderburg-Plön (1622–1671) (b. 1595)
- October 26 – Sir John Gell, 1st Baronet, English politician (b. 1593)
- November 12 – Thomas Fairfax, 3rd Lord Fairfax of Cameron, English Civil War general (b. 1612)
- November 20 – Thomas Trenchard, English politician (b. 1640)
- December 13 – Antonio Grassi, Italian Roman Catholic priest and beatus (b. 1592)
- December 18 – Samuel Gott, English politician (b. 1614)
- December 28 – Johann Friedrich Gronovius, German classical scholar (b. 1611)
