= 1504 =

1504 in various calendars
- Gregorian calendar: 1504; MDIV
- Ab urbe condita: 2257
- Armenian calendar: 953; ԹՎ ՋԾԳ
- Assyrian calendar: 6254
- Balinese saka calendar: 1425–1426
- Bengali calendar: 910–911
- Berber calendar: 2454
- English Regnal year: 19 Hen. 7 – 20 Hen. 7
- Buddhist calendar: 2048
- Burmese calendar: 866
- Byzantine calendar: 7012–7013
- Chinese calendar: 癸亥年 (Water Pig); 4201 or 3994 — to — 甲子年 (Wood Rat); 4202 or 3995
- Coptic calendar: 1220–1221
- Discordian calendar: 2670
- Ethiopian calendar: 1496–1497
- Hebrew calendar: 5264–5265
- Hindu calendars
- Vikram Samvat: 1560–1561
- Shaka Samvat: 1425–1426
- Kali Yuga: 4604–4605
- Holocene calendar: 11504
- Igbo calendar: 504–505
- Iranian calendar: 882–883
- Islamic calendar: 909–910
- Japanese calendar: Bunki 4 / Eishō 1 (永正元年)
- Javanese calendar: 1421–1422
- Julian calendar: 1504; MDIV
- Korean calendar: 3837
- Minguo calendar: 408 before ROC 民前408年
- Nanakshahi calendar: 36
- Thai solar calendar: 2046–2047
- Tibetan calendar: ཆུ་མོ་ཕག་ལོ་ (female Water-Boar); 1630 or 1249 or 477 — to — ཤིང་ཕོ་བྱི་བ་ལོ་ (male Wood-Rat); 1631 or 1250 or 478

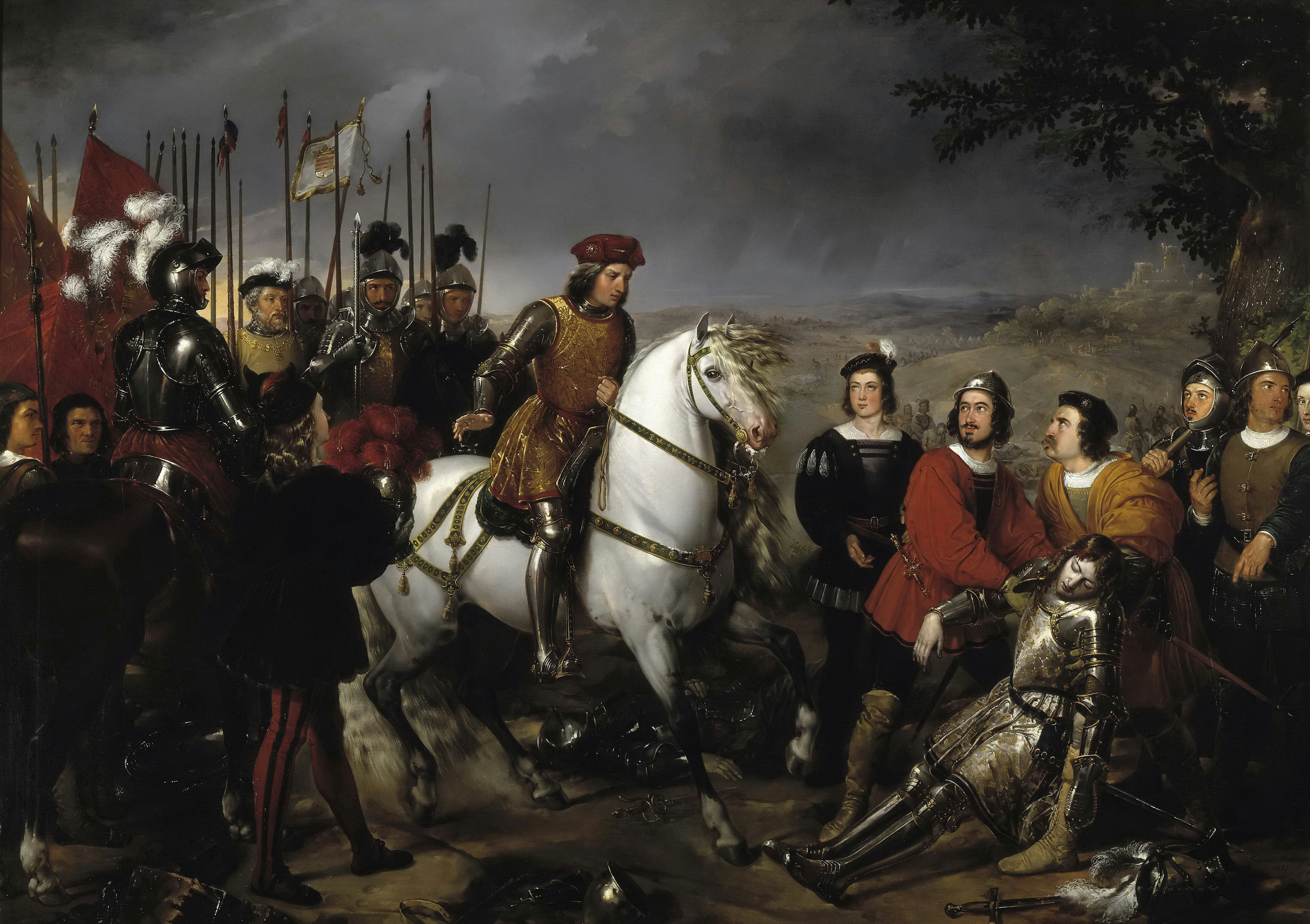
January 31: Treaty of Lyon signed

Year 1504 (MDIV) was a leap year starting on Monday of the Julian calendar.

== Events ==
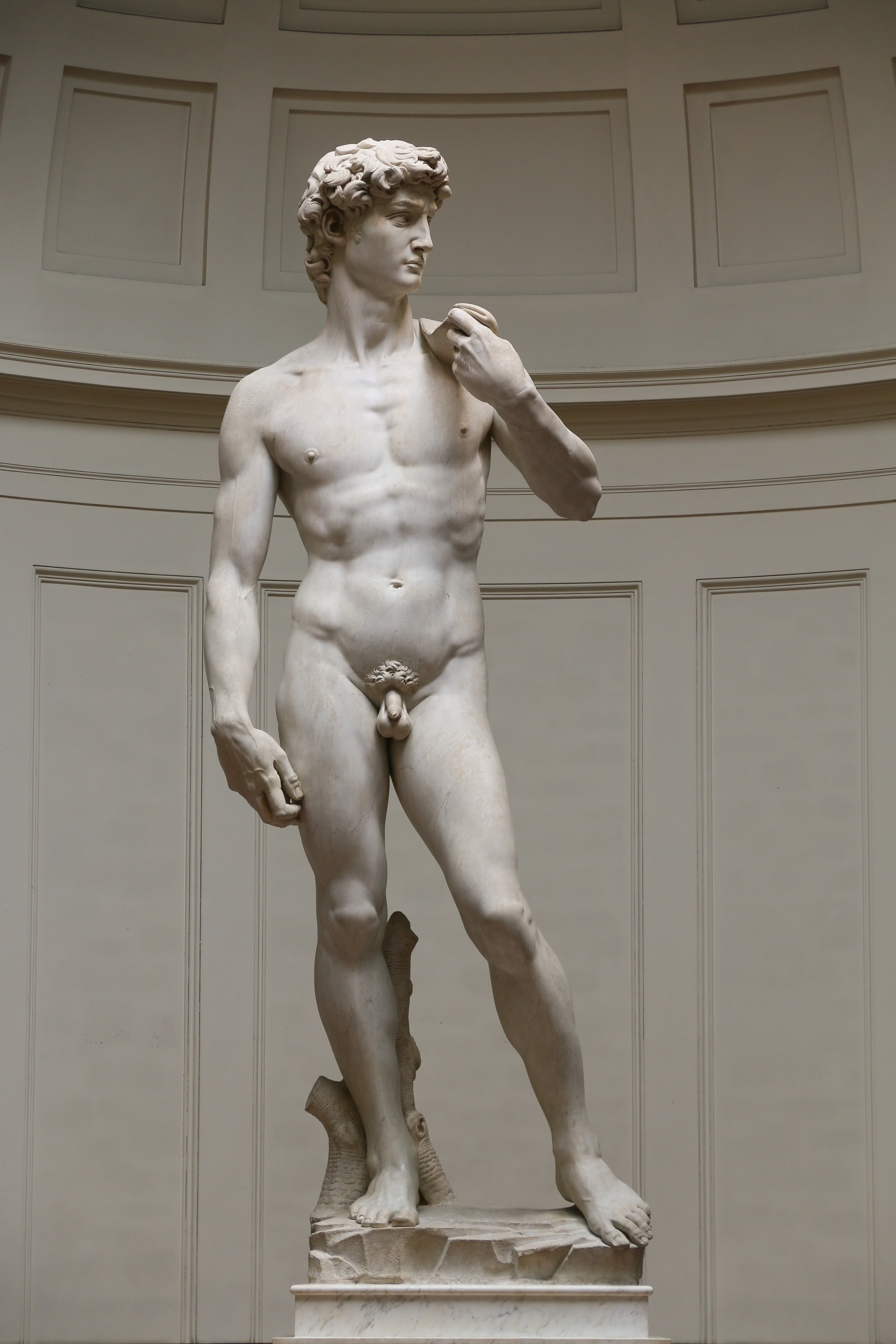
September 8: Michelangelo's David is completed.

=== January–March ===
- January 1 – French troops of King Louis XII surrender Gaeta to the Spanish, under Gonzalo Fernández de Córdoba.
- January 21 – After the death of Sten Sture the Elder on December 14 the year before, Svante Nilsson is elected the new Regent of Sweden.
- January 31 – Treaty of Lyon: France cedes Naples to Ferdinand II of Aragon, who becomes King of Naples as Ferdinand III.
- February 14 – King Ferdinand V of Castile contracts with Juan de la Cosa to finance an independent expedition to the Pearl Islands and the Gulf of Urabá.
- February 18 – The investiture of Prince Henry of England as Prince of Wales and Earl of Chester takes place.
- February 29 – Christopher Columbus uses his knowledge of a lunar eclipse this night, to convince the indigenous Jamaican people to provide him with supplies (in Europe, the eclipse is in the early morning of March 1).
- March 11 – King James IV opens the Scottish Parliament for the first time since 1496.
- March 16 – In what is now India's Kerala state, a second invasion of the Portuguese-supported Kingdom of Cochin by the Zamorin of Calicut takes place, beginning a war that lasts until July 3.
- March 30 – The Eisho era begins in Japan during the reign of Emperor Go-Kashiwabara as the Bunki era ends.

=== April–June ===
- April 1 – Guilds in England become subject to state control.
- April 23 – Maximilian I, Holy Roman Emperor grants the Landshut inheritance to Albert IV during the War of the Succession of Landshut. Maximilian would pronounce an imperial ban on Ruprecht on May 4, whom Albert contested for the territory.
- May 24 – Le Hien Tong, Emperor of Vietnam, dies after a reign of six years and is succeeded by his 15-year-old son Le Tuc Tong.
- June 17 – Rao Bika Rathore, ruler of the Kingdom of Bikaner in India, dies after a reign of 32 years. For a brief time Bika is succeeded by his elder son Nara, but Nara quickly dies and Nara is succeeded by his brother Lunkaran.
- June 28 – After being marooned in Jamaica for six months, Christopher Columbus and his men are rescued by a Spanish ship.

=== July–September ===
- July 2 – Bogdan III the One-Eyed becomes the new Prince of Moldavia upon the death of his father Stephen the Great.
- July 3 – The siege of Cochin in India by the invading forces of Calicut ends as the Portuguese and Cochin defenders defeat the invaders. Calicut loses 5,000 dead in battle and another 13,000 to disease, while Cochin and Portugal sustain minimal losses.
- July 7 – At the age of 16, Lê Túc Tông becomes the new Emperor of Vietnam (Dai Viet) after the death of his father, Lê Hiến Tông, but serves for only six months before dying.
- July 20 – Pope Julius II issues an order reforming the official coinage of the Papal States, raising the silver content of the carlino coin to four grams. In that the Pope was formerly Giuliano della Rovere, the new coin is called the giulio in his honor and features the coat of arms of the della Rovere family.
- August 19 – The Battle of Knockdoe is fought in Ireland's County Galway as 6,000 troops led by the English Lord Deputy of Ireland, Gerald FitzGerald, 8th Earl of Kildare assist Maelsechlainn mac Tadhg Ó Cellaigh, King of Uí Mháine, against 4,000 troops of Irish chieftain Ulick Fionn Burke, Lord of the Clanricarde lands. Burke had previously attacked and destroyed Ó Cellaigh's castles at Monivea, Castleblakeney and Garbally and sought Kildare's help. Kildare's forces win the battle.
- September 8 – Michelangelo's sculpture of David is unveiled in Florence.
- September 13 – Queen Isabella and King Ferdinand issue a Royal Warrant for the construction of Capilla Real, a Royal Chapel, to be built in Granada.
- September 22 – Treaty of Blois: Philip the Handsome, Maximilian I, and Louis XII agree to terms.

=== October–December ===
- October 12 – Isabella I of Castile signs her will and testament.
- November 7 – Christopher Columbus returns to Spain from his fourth voyage, during which he and his younger son, Ferdinand, explored the coast of Central America from Belize to Panama.
- November 26 – On the death of Isabella I of Castile, Catholic Queen of Castile and Aragon, the Crown of Castile passes to her daughter Joanna.
- December 8
  - (approximate date) Islamic scholar Ahmad ibn Abi Jum'ah issues the Oran fatwa for Muslims in Spain (1 Rajab 910 AH in Islamic calendar, Gregorian date is approximate).
  - Lê Túc Tông dies after a reign of only six months as Emperor of Vietnam.
- December 24 – Nils Ravaldsson, the leader of the rebellion after Knut Alvsson's death, is attacked and his resistance crushed at Olsborg Castle in Båhuslen.

=== Date unknown ===
- October – Babur besieges and captures Kabul.
- Islamization of the Sudan region: A Funj leader, Amara Dunqas, founds the Sultanate of Sennar.
- Sheikh Ahmed, the final leader of the Great Horde, is last heard of as a Lithuanian prisoner at Vilnius until 1527 when he was released, after which he came to rule over the Astrakhan Khanate.
- In Florence, Leonardo da Vinci and Niccolò Machiavelli become involved in a scheme to divert the Arno River, cutting the water supply to Pisa to force its surrender: Colombino, the project foreman, fails to follow da Vinci's design, and the project is a major failure.
- The Council of Ten discusses the advisability of proposing a scheme of a Suez Canal to the Sultan of Egypt, at the time Al-Ashraf Qansuh al-Ghuri, but the discussion is eventually abandoned.
- Aldus Manutius publishes his edition of Demosthenes in Venice.
- The Signoria of Florence commissions both Leonardo da Vinci and Michelangelo to paint the walls of the Grand Council Chamber in the Palazzo Vecchio.
- Raphael paints The Marriage of the Virgin, which exemplifies some major principles of High Renaissance art.

== Births ==
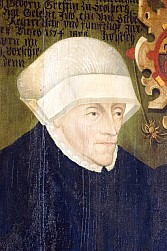
Anna II, Princess-Abbess of Quedlinburg

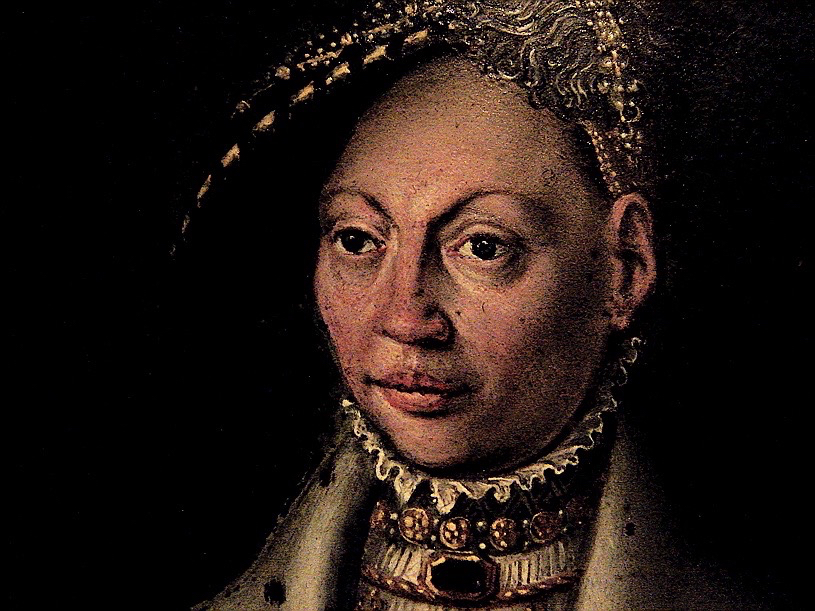
Dorothea of Denmark, Duchess of Prussia

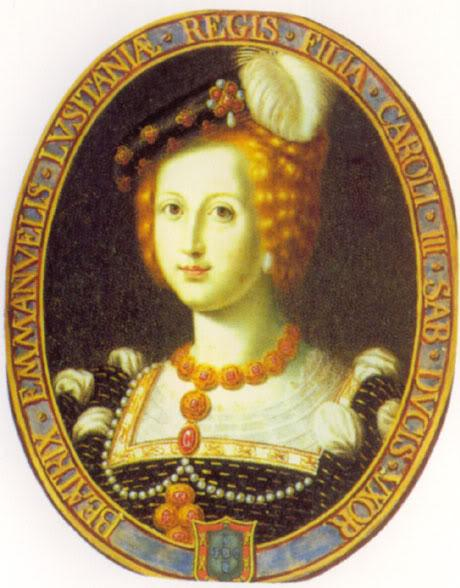
Beatrice of Portugal, Duchess of Savoy

- January 1 – Caspar Creuziger, German humanist (d. 1548)
- January 17 – Pope Pius V (d. 1572)
- January 28 – Anna II, Princess-Abbess of Quedlinburg, German noblewoman, reigning from 1516 until her death (d. 1574)
- February 3 – Scipione Rebiba, Italian cardinal (d. 1577)
- March 31 – Guru Angad, Indian religious leader (d. 1552)
- April 12 – Alessandro Campeggio, Italian cardinal (d. 1554)
- April 30 – Francesco Primaticcio, Italian painter (d. 1570)
- May 5 – Stanislaus Hosius, Polish cardinal (d. 1579)
- May 29 – Antun Vrančić, Croatian archbishop (d. 1573)
- June 24 – Johannes Mathesius, German theologian (d. 1565)
- July 18 – Heinrich Bullinger, Swiss religious reformer (d. 1575)
- August 1 – Dorothea of Denmark, Duchess of Prussia, Danish princess (d. 1547)
- August 6 – Matthew Parker, English Archbishop of Canterbury (d. 1574)
- September 4 – John V, Prince of Anhalt-Zerbst, Prince of Anahlt-Dessau (1516–1544) and Anhalt-Zerbst (1544–1551) (d. 1551)
- September 20 – Philip III, Count of Nassau-Weilburg (d. 1559)
- October 29 – Shin Saimdang, Korean calligraphist and noted poet (d. 1551)
- November – Giovanni Battista Giraldi, Italian novelist and poet (d. 1573)
- November 13 – Philip I, Landgrave of Hesse (d. 1567)
- December – Nicholas Udall, English playwright and schoolmaster (d. 1556)
- December 31 – Beatrice of Portugal, Duchess of Savoy (d. 1538)
- date unknown
  - John Dudley, 1st Duke of Northumberland, English Tudor nobleman and politician (executed 1553)
  - Patrick Hamilton, Scottish churchman and Reformer (burned at the stake 1528)
  - Dirk Philips, early Dutch Anabaptist writer and theologian (d. 1568)

== Deaths ==
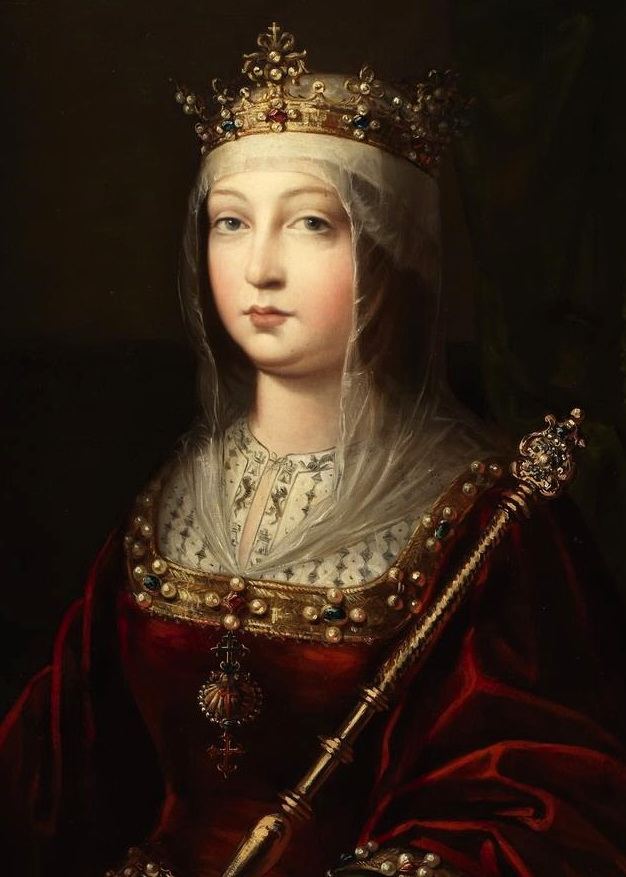
Isabella I of Castile

- January 9 – Gaspare Nadi, Italian builder (b. 1418)
- January 27 – Marquess Ludovico II of Saluzzo (b. 1438)
- February 17 – Eberhard II, Duke of Württemberg (b. 1447)
- April 15 – Filippino Lippi, Italian painter (b. 1457)
- May 31 – Engelbert II of Nassau (b. 1451)
- June – Lê Hiến Tông, Emperor of the Lê Dynasty
- June 19 – Bernhard Walther, German astronomer and humanist (b. 1430)
- July 2 – Stephen the Great, Prince of Moldova (b. 1434)
- July 29 – Thomas Stanley, 1st Earl of Derby (b. 1435)
- August 15 or August 18 – Domenico Maria Novara da Ferrara, Italian astronomer (b. 1454)
- August 20 – Ruprecht of the Palatinate (bishop of Freising) (b. 1481)
- August 22 – Philipp II, Count of Hanau-Lichtenberg (1489–1503) (b. 1462)
- August 28 – John Paston, English gentleman known from the Paston Letters (b. 1444)
- September 10 – Duke Philibert II of Savoy (b. 1480)
- September 15 – Elisabeth of Bavaria (b. 1478)
- September 22 – Jan II the Mad, Duke of Żagań (1439–1449 and 1461–1468 and again in 1472) (b. 1435)
- September 24 – Bartolomeo della Rocca ("Cocles"), Italian astrologer (b. 1467)
- October 12 – John Corvinus, Hungarian noble (b. 1473)
- November 9 – King Frederick IV of Naples (b. 1452)
- November 26 – Queen Isabella I of Castile (b. 1451)
- December – Lê Túc Tông, Emperor of the Lê Dynasty
- December 21 – Berthold von Henneberg, German archbishop and elector (b. 1442)
- date unknown
  - Abdal-Karim Khan Astrakhani, Khan of Astrakhan
  - Abu Abdallah IV, Sultan of Tlemcen
  - Abu Abd Allah al-Sheikh Muhammad ibn Yahya, first Wattasid Sultan of Morocco and King of Fez
  - Éamonn Mág Samhradháin, Lord of Tullyhaw
  - Fathullah Imad-ul-Mulk, Indian-born founder of the Berar Sultanate
  - Qasim Barid I, founder of the Bidar Sultanate
  - Vira Ravi Ravi Varma, Raja of Venad
  - Choe Bu, Korean official and venturer to China (b. 1454)
