= Nguyễn Bặc =

- Grand chancellor
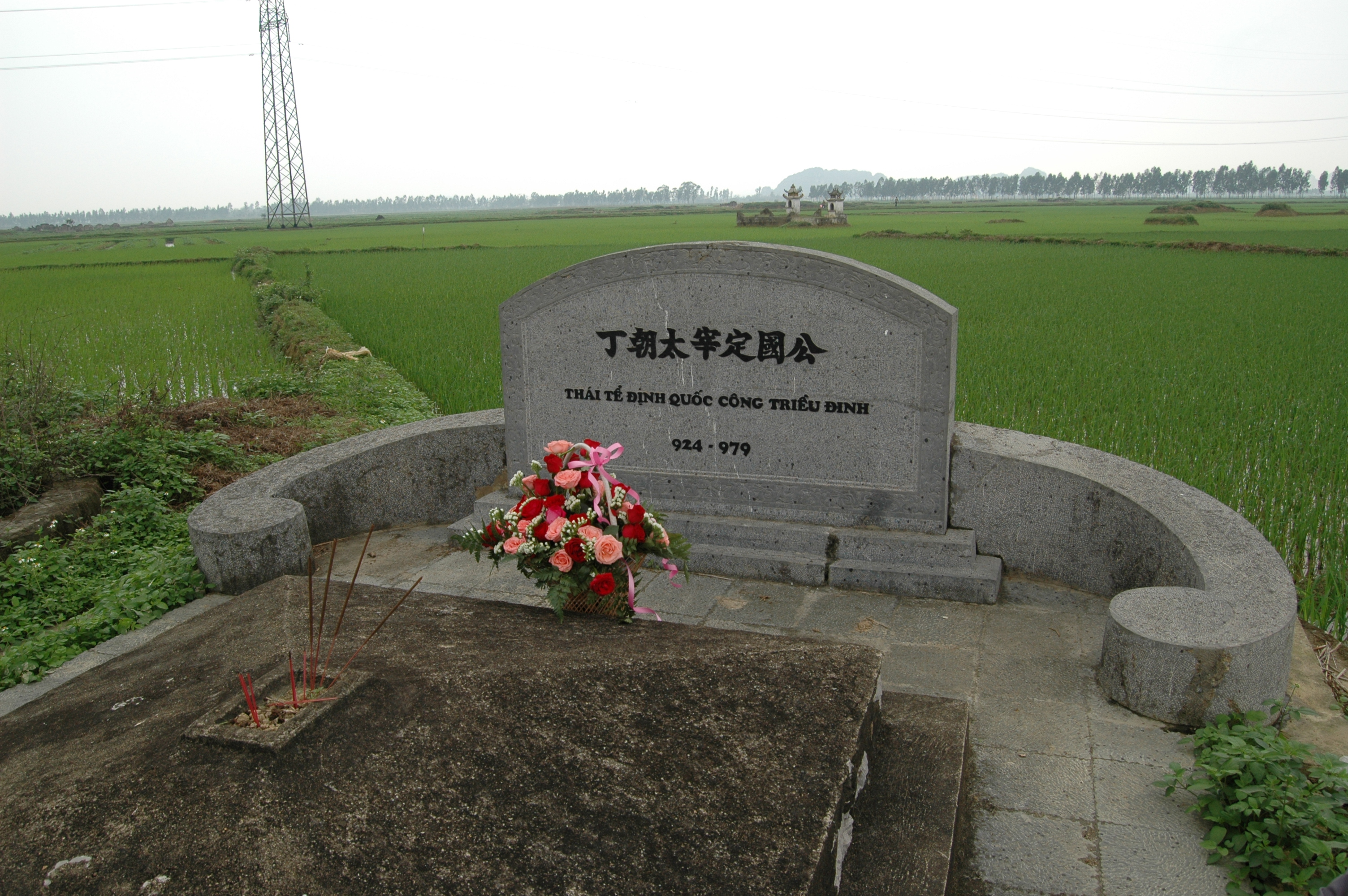
- Nguyễn Bặc's grave

Grand chancellor of Đinh dynasty
- Reign: 968–979
- Predecessor: Position established
- Successor: Position abolished
- Born: 924; Gia Viễn, Ninh Bình province
- Died: 15 October 979 (aged 55); Hoa Lư
- Issue: Nguyễn Đê; Nguyễn Đạt
Names
- Nguyễn Bặc
- House: Nguyễn dynasty
- Father: Nguyễn Thước

Nguyễn Bặc (chữ Hán: 阮匐, 924 – 15 October 979), also known with the noble title Định Quốc Công (定國公), was a Vietnamese mandarin and general who served as the Grand Chancellor of Đinh dynasty and was the first chancellor in Vietnamese history. He helped future emperor Đinh Bộ Lĩnh put an end to the troubles of the Anarchy of the 12 Warlords and to establish the short-lived Đinh dynasty. After Đinh Bộ Lĩnh and his chosen successor Đinh Liễn were murdered by a palace official, Đỗ Thích, Nguyễn Bặc captured the murderer and had him executed. He then tried unsuccessfully to organize resistance to Lê Hoàn. According to Nguyễn Phúc tộc thế phả (Nguyễn Phúc clan Family tree book), Nguyễn Bặc was the ancestor of the Nguyễn Phúc clan, followed by founding of the Nguyễn lords by Nguyễn Hoàng in 1558 and Nguyễn dynasty in 1802 under the emperor Gia Long. As a result, he was sometimes considered to be a patriarch of the surname Nguyen, which is the most common amongst all Vietnamese people. Moreover, he was considered as one of the "seven heroes of Giao Châu" (Giao Chỉ province) according to Việt Sử tân biên including: Đinh Bộ Lĩnh, Đinh Liễn, Lê Hoàn, Đinh Điền, Phạm Hạp and Phạm Cự Lượng.

== Early life ==
According to Khâm định Việt sử Thông giám cương mục, Nguyễn Bặc was born in Hoa Lư Cave, Đại Hoàng province, Đại Cồ Việt.

As a youngster growing up in Hoa-Lư Nguyễn Bặc befriended Đinh Bộ Lĩnh, and eventually they and another village kid named Đinh Điền, Trịnh Tú and Lưu Cơ.In their early teenage years the three sworn-brothers and children of neighboring villages achieved notoriety for constantly playing war-games. As time passed, the power of the Đinh Bộ Lĩnh's gang in Hoa-lư became legendary. In the early 960s Vietnam was thrust into chaos due to the petty wars of the Twelve Feudal-Warlords (Thập-nhị Sứ-quân). Naturally, Đinh Bộ Lĩnh and his peasant-warriors were compelled to involve themselves in the struggle. Because of their weaknesses Đinh Bộ Lĩnh decided to lead his followers into an alliance with an ethnic Chinese named Trần Lãm, the feudal warlord who had control of Bố-hải Port, the commercial center of the kingdom. The alliance, formed in 963 A.D., turned out to be Đinh Bộ Lĩnh's wisest move. Đinh Bộ Lĩnh soon transformed his Hoa-Lư warriors and Trần Lãm's mercenaries into a force to be reckon. With his sworn-brothers, Nguyễn Bặc and Đinh Điền, as his most trusted commanders and advisers, Đinh Bộ Lĩnh began setting out conquering the other eleven feudal warlords to unite the kingdom. Trần Lãm, who was more concerned with the commercial prospects of the conquest than with the unification of Vietnam, gladly and financial supported Đinh Bộ Lĩnh's ambitious plan. As Đinh Bộ Lĩnh's highly disciplined army crushed one warlord after another, people began referring to the three sworn-brothers and four other of Đinh Bo Lĩnh's assistants as the Seven Heroes of Giao-châu (Giao-châu Thất Hùng).

== Chancellor of Đại Cồ Việt ==
In historical records, he had 2 brothers Nguyễn Bồ and Nguyễn Phục who all three joined in the Đinh Bộ Lĩnh's army to suppress the uprising of 12 warlords. After gaining victory, Đinh Bộ Lĩnh establish the new empire and positioned as the chancellor of dynasty.

After conquering ten of the eleven warlords Đinh Bộ Lĩnh then proclaimed himself emperor in 968 A.D. To deal with the last warlord Emperor Đinh Bộ Lĩnh assigned Nguyễn Bặc the task, for it was this obstinate warlord, Nguyễn Thủ-Tiệp, that had killed Nguyện Bặc's older and only brother, Nguyễn Bồ. After three or four battles Nguyễn Bặc rooted Nguyễn Thủ-Tiệp out of his stronghold at Tiên-Du, the old provincial heartland of the kingdom. Nguyễn Thủ-Tiệp fled south to Diễn Province near the Cham frontier and died there a few months later. Nguyễn Bặc then returned in triumph to the newly established capital at Hoa-Lư.

As emperor, Đinh Bộ Lĩnh quickly rewarded his long time followers. He placed Nguyễn Bặc at the head of the nobility with the title Nation-Establishing Duke (Định-Quốc Công) and officially adopted Nguyễn Bặc into the newly established royal family. Like Emperor Đinh Bộ Lĩnh, Nguyễn Bặc had risen from the peasantry class to become one of the most powerful figures in the kingdom of Great Việt (Đại-Cồ-Việt), as Vietnam was named under the Đinh.

When Emperor Đinh Bộ Lĩnh and his heir apparent fell victims to an imperial attendant's sword in 979 A.D., the shocked and furious Nguyễn Bặc beheaded Đỗ Thích, the assassin, then had the corpse ground up for consumption by the people of Hoa-Lư. The people of Hoa-Lư, enraged at the assassin for killing their greatest local hero, did not decline the bizarre offering. Nguyễn Bặc and his only surviving sworn-brother, Đinh Điền, installed the dead emperor's last son, who was only five-years-old, as emperor.

Be that as it may, the discovery of a secret affair between the child-emperor's mother and the ambitious Lê Hoàn, whom the late Emperor Đinh Bộ Lĩnh had made the General of the Ten Circuits (Thập-Đạo Tướng-Quân), marked the end of the Đinh dynasty. With the Queen-Mother's support Lê Hoàn quickly declared himself Viceroy (Nhiếp-Chính), and began plotting a coup d'état. Upon receiving news of the plot, Nguyễn Bặc and Đinh Điền, both were in Ái Province (Thanh-Hóa) at the time, promptly returned to court with their forces. Lê Hoàn sent out messengers to convince Nguyễn Bặc to cooperate in the establishment of a new dynasty. Naturally, the disgusted Nguyễn Bặc and his sworn-brother, Đinh Điền, declined and civil war once again erupted.

The ensuing civil war did not last long. Lê Hoàn, as commander-in-chief of the main imperial army, easily crushed the Đinh loyalists headed by Nguyễn Bặc. Nguyễn Bặc was captured and executed on the bank of the Chanh River outside the citadel of Hoa-lư on 8 November 979 A.D. (October 15 of the lunar calendar). Đinh Điền and his wife escaped capture and then died mysteriously a month later. In a period of three months the three sworn-brothers died treacherously at the hands of individuals whom they had employed and trusted most.

After the death of Nguyễn Bặc Lê Hoàn declared himself emperor and founded a new dynasty in 980 A.D. The Sung dynasty of China refused to recognize Lê Hoàn and launched an invasion of Vietnam the following year. However, Lê Hoàn refused to submit and rallied the great army that Đinh Bộ Lĩnh had built to face the Chinese expeditionary forces. The Vietnamese fought and won another decisive war against the intruding Chinese. The trap laid out by the defending Vietnamese not only killed the Chinese commander-in-chief but also captured his two top commanders. News of the routing of the land forces compelled the Chinese invading fleet to flee back to China. The successes of Lê Hoàn's campaign were due largely to the great military machine that Đinh Bộ Lĩnh, Nguyễn Bặc and Đinh Điễn had wholehearted nurtured and formed since the days they played innocent war-games in the village of Hoa-Lư.

People throughout the kingdom of Đại Cồ Việt, especially the villagers around the Hoa-Lư region who knew Emperor Đinh Bộ Lĩnh, Nguyễn Bặc and Đinh Điền best, grieved at their tragic deaths. To remember their virtues and loyalty, the Vietnamese villagers deified the three sworn-brothers like Liu Bei (Lưu Bị), Guan Yu (Quan Vũ) and Zhang Fei (Trương Phi) of China and had temples built in their names. In Đại Hữu village near Hoa-Lư a temple for the three local heroes still stands today. A statue of Nguyễn Bặc still exists at his temple in Ngô-Hạ hamlet, Hoa-Lư District. Nguyễn Bặc's descendants, including the Nguyễn-Phúc Clan, still pay their respects annually at the tomb built for him by the Đại-Hữu villagers in 979 A.D.

Nguyễn Bặc's son Nguyễn Đê survived the tragedy of 979 A.D. and later became a battle-buddy of a commander of the Imperial Guards (Điện Tiền Chị Huy Sứ) named Lý Công Uản. With Nguyễn Đê's support Lý Công Uẩn deposed the unpopular Emperor Lê Ngọa Triều, and ascended the throne as the first emperor of the Later Lý dynasty. Following their forebear's footsteps Nguyễn Đê and his sons remained loyal servants of the Lý dynasty.

Furthermore, many of Nguyễn Bặc's successors also gave their lives trying to protect or serve their emperors. Nguyễn Phụng, Nguyễn Bặc's great-grandson, was killed in 1150 for attempting to destroy the usurper Đỗ Anh Vũ. General Nguyễn Nạp Hòa, a descendant of Nguyễn Bặc and Nguyễn Phụng, was killed along with Emperor Trần Duệ Tông in 1377 while engaging in battle with the famous Cham king, Chế Bồng Nga.

Nguyễn Công Luật, General Nguyễn Nạp Hòa's son, also died with Emperor Trần Phế Đế under the hands of the usurper Hồ Qúy Ly in 1388. Nguyễn Công Duẫn, Nguyễn Công Luật's great-grandson, became Lê Lợi's commander of the Tống Sơn region (Thanh Hóa) during the war of liberation. After forcing the Ming Chinese to withdraw from Vietnam Lê Lợi proclaimed himself emperor and adopted Nguyễn Công Duẫn into the Lê royal family.

Nguyễn Bặc's descendants through Nguyễn Công Duẫn's line continued their family's tradition of excellent national service. When the capital Đông Đô fell into the hands of Trần Cao, it was Nguyễn Văn Lựu, Nguyễn Công Duẫn's grandson, who recaptured the capital and restored Emperor Lê Tương Dực to the throne. Likewise, when Mặc Đăng Dung killed Emperor Lê Cung Hoàng in 1527 and proclaimed himself emperor, it was Nguyễn Cam (or Kim) who took refuge in Laos and campaigned to restore the Lê dynasty. Emperor Lê Cung Hoàng's son was finally discovered and was then made emperor by Nguyễn Cam. Lê's forces under Nguyễn Cam was beginning to gain momentum when Dương Chấp Nhất, a general for the Mac's, fatally poisoned Nguyễn Cam.

== Ancestor of Nguyễn clan ==
The history of the Nguyễn family began to change drastically after the death of Nguyễn Kim in 1545. After the death of Nguyễn Kim his two sons, Nguyễn Uông and Nguyễn Hoàng, continued to fight the Mạc for the Lê dynasty. However, it was Nguyễn Kim's son-in-law, Trịnh Kiểm, that triggered the event that changed the whole history of Vietnam.

Besides these great male descendants of Nguyễn Bặc, there were also other royal descendants of his through the female lines. Nguyễn Công Duẫn's granddaughter, Nguyễn Thị Ngọc Hằng (daughter of Nguyễn Đức Trung), married Emperor Lê Thánh Tông and then gave birth to a prince who later became Emperor Lê Hiến Tông (1497-1504). Hence, Emperor Lê Hiến Tông and his subsequent royal descendants all had Nguyễn Bặc's blood in them. Nguyễn Thị Ngọc Bảo, the older sister of Lord Nguyễn Hoàng, was married to Trịnh Kiểm and later gave birth to Trịnh Kiểm's immediate successor, Lord Trịnh Tùng. Hence, Trịnh's royal family from Trịnh Tùng down all carried Nguyễn Bặc's blood.

Nguyễn princesses were also married to non-Vietnamese rulers as well. In 1620, Princess Nguyễn Thị Ngọc Vạn, daughter Lord Nguyễn Phúc Nguyên, became the wife of Chey Chettha II of the Khmer Empire. King Chey Chetta II granted Princess Nguyễn Thị Ngọc Vạn's wish and allowed Vietnamese natives to settle in Mô Xoài (Bà Rịa). Finally, prior to the complete conquest of Champa, Lord Nguyễn Phúc Nguyên also betrothed his daughter, Nguyễn Phúc Ngọc Khoa, to Po Rome - King of Champa in 1631.

== See also ==
- Nguyễn Đê
- Nguyễn Phục
