= Túc Tông =

- Vietnamese alphabet: Túc Tông
- Chữ Hán: 肅宗
- Literal meaning: Solemn Ancestor

Túc Tông is the temple name used for several monarchs of Vietnam. It may refer to:

- Lê Túc Tông (1488–1504), emperor of the Lê dynasty
- Nguyễn Phúc Trú (1696–1738), one of the Nguyễn lords

== See also ==
- Suzong (disambiguation) (Chinese equivalent)
- Sukjong (disambiguation) (Korean equivalent)
