= Trịnh Thị Ngọc Trinh =

- Born: ? Bình Lăng village, Tứ Kỳ district, Hải Đông town, Vietnam
- Died: ? Đông Kinh, Vietnam
- Spouse: Lê Kính Tông
- Issue: Lê Thần Tông

Trịnh Thị Ngọc Trinh (chữ Hán: 鄭氏玉楨, ? - ?) was a queen consort of Later Lê dynasty. She was the wife of emperor Lê Kính Tông and mother of emperor Lê Thần Tông.

== Biography ==
Empress Trịnh Thị Ngọc Trinh was the second daughter of lord Trịnh Tùng. She was born at Bình Lăng village, Tứ Kỳ district, Hải Đông town.

She was given in the marriage with prince Lê Duy Tân in 1599 when he became emperor Kính Tông. Her hereditary title was Đoan Từ Empress (端慈皇后).

In 1619, after the fall of coup d'état to exterminate lord Trịnh Tùng, Lê Kính Tông killed himself by a string and his comrade Trịnh Xuân was executed heartlessly. In that time, an official suggested lord Trịnh Tùng to support the duke Lê Trụ as new emperor, but Trịnh Thị Ngọc Trinh cried and persuaded him to support her son Duy Kỳ. Finally prince Lê Duy Kỳ was acceded to the throne as emperor Thần Tông. Trịnh Thị Ngọc Trinh became Đoan Từ Dowager Empress (端慈皇太后).

Her posthumous name was Đoan Từ Huệ Dowager Empress (端慈惠皇太后).

== See also ==
- Trịnh Tùng
- Lê Kính Tông
- Lê Thần Tông
