= Lê Duy Kỳ =

Lê Duy Kỳ was the birth name of:

- Emperor Lê Thần Tông
- Emperor Lê Chiêu Thống
