= Suzong =

- Chinese: 肅宗
- Literal meaning: Solemn Ancestor
Transcriptions
Standard Mandarin
- Hanyu Pinyin: Sùzōng
- Wade–Giles: Su^{4}-tsung^{1}

Suzong is the temple name used for several emperors of China. It may refer to:

- Emperor Zhang of Han (57–88)
- Emperor Xiaoming of Northern Wei (510–528)
- Emperor Xiaozhao of Northern Qi (535–561)
- Emperor Suzong of Tang (711–762)

== See also ==
- Sukjong (disambiguation), Korean equivalent
- Túc Tông (disambiguation), Vietnamese equivalent
