= Phạm Hạp =

- Born: About 930s Trà Hương village, Nam Sách district, Hồng Châu, Annam Province, Tang China
- Died: 979; Tràng An, Đại Cồ Việt
- Spouse: Đoàn Thị Mỗ
- Children: ?
- Parent(s): Phạm Mạn (father); Trần Thị Hồng (mother)

Phạm Hạp (‹The template Chuhan is being considered for deletion.› chữ Hán: 范盍, 930s – 979) was a general of the Đinh dynasty. Some Chinese records call him one of Seven Heroes of Giao-châu (交州七雄).

== See also ==
- Phạm Cự Lạng
- Phạm Ngũ Lão
- Đinh Tiên Hoàng
- Lê Hoàn
- Nguyễn Bặc
