= Sabine baronets =

Extinct baronetcy in the Baronetage of England

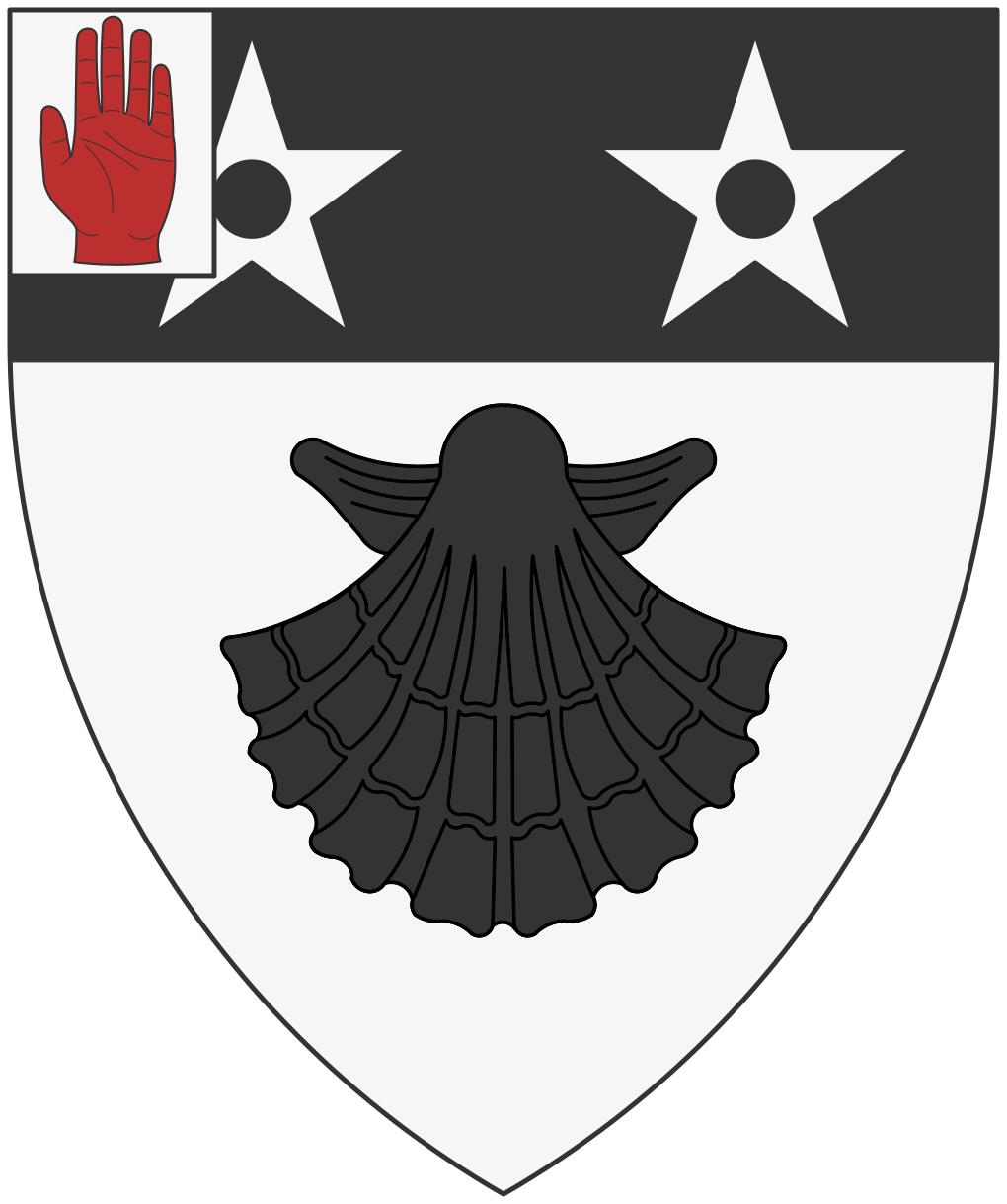
Arms of Sabine of Ion House

The Sabine Baronetcy, of Ion House in the County of Bedford, was a title in the Baronetage of England. It was created on 22 March 1671 for John Sabine. The title became extinct on his death in 1704.

== Sabine baronets, of Ion House (1671) ==
- Sir John Sabine, 1st Baronet (c. 1639–1704)
