= Lê Chân Tông =

Lê Chân Tông 黎真宗
- Emperor of Đại Việt

Emperor of Revival Lê dynasty
- Reign: 1643–1649
- Predecessor: Lê Thần Tông
- Successor: Lê Thần Tông; Lê Huyền Tông
- Regent: Trịnh Tráng
- Born: 1630; Đông Kinh, Đại Việt
- Died: 2 October 1649 (aged 18–19); Đông Kinh, Đại Việt
- Burial: Hoa Phố Tomb (花浦陵)
Names
- Lê Duy Hựu (黎維祐)
Era name and dates
- Phúc Thái (福泰): 1643–1649
Posthumous name
- Thuận Hoàng đế (順皇帝)
Temple name
- Chân Tông (真宗)
- House: Revival Lê dynasty
- Father: Lê Thần Tông
- Mother: Nguyễn Thị Ngọc Bạch

Lê Chân Tông (黎真宗, 1630 – 2 October 1649) was the 18th monarch of Vietnamese Later Lê dynasty.

== Biography ==
Lê Chân Tông's birth name is Lê Duy Hựu (黎維祐), courtesy name Duy Đề (維禔). He was born in 1630 and reigned from 1643 to 1649, interrupting the reign of his father Lê Thần Tông who reigned 1619–1643 and again 1649–1662. He was a figurehead emperor under the power of lord Trịnh Tráng who ruled 1623–1657.

== Family ==
Consorts and their respective issues:

- Queen Trịnh Thị (芳慈皇后鄭氏)

Preceded by Lê Thần Tông	Emperor of Vietnam; 1643–1649	Succeeded by Lê Thần Tông
