= Vira Ravi Ravi Varma =

- Raja of Venad, Trippapur Moopan, Chiravay Moopan

Headship of Trippapur Swaroopam
- Reign: 1479 - 1492
- Predecessor: Revathi Thirunal Rama Varma
- Successor: Vira Ravi Udaya Marthanda Varma

Senior Raja of Venad
- Reign: 1484 - 1512
- Predecessor: Vishakham Thirunal Kodai Aditya Varma
- Successor: Bhutala Vira Udaya Marthanda Varma
- Born: Pururttathi Thirunal Vira Ravi Ravi Varma
- Royal House: Trippapur-Keezhperoor

Vira Ravi Ravi Varma was a Raja who ruled in Venad, also known as the Kingdom of Kupaka, between 1479 and 1512. He was a member of the Trippapur-Keezhperoor branch of the Venad royal family, predecessors of the Travancore Rajas. He moved the capital from Kallidaikurichi to Padmanabhapuram about 1500. He was one of the senior rulers of Venad when the Portuguese arrived in India.

He was a renowned patron of the thanumalayan temple and is known to have been a patron of the devadasis as well.

Vira Ravi Ravi Varma Kulasekhara Dynasty
Preceded by Vira Kodai Sri Aditya Varma	Senior Raja of Venad; 1484–1512	Succeeded by Bhutala Vira Udaya Marthnda Varma
