= Lê Gia Tông =

Lê Gia Tông 黎嘉宗
- Emperor of Đại Việt

Emperor of Đại Việt
- Reign: 1672–1675
- Predecessor: Lê Huyền Tông
- Successor: Lê Hy Tông
- Regent: Trịnh Tạc
- Born: 1661; Đông Kinh, Đại Việt
- Died: 27 April 1675 (aged 13–14); Đông Kinh, Đại Việt
- Burial: Phúc An Tomb (福安陵)
Names
- Lê Duy Cối (黎維禬)
Era name and dates
- Dương Đức (陽德): 1672–1674; Đức Nguyên (德元): 1674–1675
Posthumous name
- Khoan Minh Mẫn Đạt Anh Quả Huy Nhu Khắc Nhân Đốc Nghĩa Mỹ Hoàng đế (寬明敏達英果徽柔克仁篤義美皇帝)
Temple name
- Gia Tông (嘉宗)
- House: House of Lê
- Father: Lê Thần Tông
- Mother: Lê Thị Ngọc Hoàn

Lê Gia Tông (黎嘉宗, 1661 – 27 April 1675) was the 20th emperor of Vietnamese Later Lê dynasty.

== Biography ==
Lê Gia Tông's birth name is Lê Duy Cối (黎維禬), courtesy name Duy Định (維礻定). He was born in 1661 and reigned from 19 November 1672 to 3 April 1675. He was a figurehead king under the power of lord Trịnh Tạc who ruled 1657–82.

Preceded by Lê Huyền Tông	Emperor of Vietnam; 1672–1675	Succeeded by Lê Hy Tông
