= Trịnh Tạc =

Trịnh Tạc 鄭柞
- Trịnh lords Lord of Tonkin
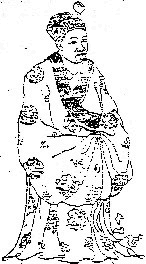

Trịnh Lords
- Reign: 1657–1682
- Predecessor: Trịnh Tráng
- Successor: Trịnh Căn
- Born: 11 April 1606; Đông Kinh, Đàng Ngoài
- Died: 24 September 1682 (age 76); Đông Kinh, Đàng Ngoài
- Spouse: Vũ Thị Ngọc Lễ; Trịnh Thị Ngọc Lung; Mai Thị Ngọc Tiến
- Issue: Trịnh Căn more sons and daughters
Names
- Trịnh Tạc (鄭柞)
Regnal name
- Tây Định vương (西定王)
Posthumous name
- Dương vương (陽王)
Temple name
- Hoằng Tổ (弘祖)
- House: Trịnh Lords
- Father: Trịnh Tráng
- Mother: Trần Thị Ngọc Đài
- Religion: Buddhism

Trịnh Tạc (Hán: 鄭柞; 11 April 1606 – 24 September 1682) ruled northern Dai Viet in 1657–1682.

Trịnh Tạc was one of the most successful of the Trịnh lords to rule northern Vietnam. During his rule, he made peace with the Nguyễn, beginning a century of peace in Vietnam. Trịnh Tạc also ended the last remnants of the pretender Mạc dynasty.

== Early career ==
In 1648 Trịnh Tạc gained more political power in the court as his father Trinh Trang’s health failed. In 1649 the Dutch reported that the young king Le Duy Huu and his uncle had allegedly poisoned Trịnh Tạc.

In 1655, Nguyễn forces advanced to Nghe An, threatening the Trịnh regime. The situation became so critical that in the autumn of that year, Trịnh Tạc and reinforcements arrived at the battlefield, managed and drove the Nguyễn back to the Gianh River. In the next year, the southerners launched a naval attack on Nghe An and Trịnh Tạc sent his eldest son Trịnh Căn with a new army to confront the Nguyễn. While Trịnh Tạc's brother Trinh Toan was the commander-in-chief of the northern army, Trịnh Tạc himself distrusted his brother. Nonetheless, Trịnh Tạc finally stopped the southern advance in mid-1656. The Nguyễn continued occupying Nghe An and Ha Tinh, and a large number of northern Vietnamese who defected to the Nguyễn were allowed to resettle further south.

== Lord of Tonkin ==
=== Military campaigns ===
In 1658 the Nguyễn resumed their offensive, reaching the northern border of Nghe An near Quynh Luu. By the end of the year Trịnh Căn had pushed the southerners back to southern banks of the Ca River.

Fighting between the Trịnh and the Nguyễn came to a lull in the next two years, 1659 and 1660. Trịnh Tạc's agents rushed into villages in enemy's occupying territories, lowering the Nguyễn morale. In late 1660 Trịnh Tạc planned for an extensive military preparation against the Nguyễn regime in the south and to fend off a potential Qing offensive, which ultimately had little success. In 1667 Trịnh Tạc's army moved north and attacked the Mạc remnants in Cao Bang, who were formerly under Ming protection. However the new Qing empire continued to support the Mạc and forced the Trịnh to withdraw.

In 1671 he sent a request to the Dutch government in Batavia to assist his last military campaign against the Nguyễn in the south. The Dutch did nothing but apologized for their inability to assist him in his demands. Regardless, Trịnh Tạc began the offensive by sending an army to break the Tran Ninh wall along the Nhật Lệ River, but the southerner prince Ton That Hiep sent general Nguyen Huu Dat to reinforce the wall and successfully repelled the northerner attack.

The costly campaign ended inclusively, and the lord turned to attack the Mạc family in the north. In 1677 his army finally destroyed the last Mạc remnants in Cao Bang province, forcing the Mac to flee to Southern China, where they were captured by the Qing army in 1683.

=== Political career ===
During the Vinh Tho era (1658–1662), Trịnh Tạc and his scholars had reestablished and revived the civil bureaucratic government that had been set up by king Le Thanh Tong in the fifteenth century, by resetting population registers, taxation, reconstructing dykes and roads, reopened state-sponsored schools and civil examinations.

In the beginning of his reign, Trịnh Tạc continued his father's friendly view toward Christian missionaries and Christian communities. However, his officials and advisors who saw the missionaries as foreigners and spies for the Nguyễn regime in Hue, gradually changed his belief. In June 1658, the Swiss superior Onuphre Borges was ordered to recall all the Jesuit missionaries in Hanoi to embark for Macao. While Trịnh Tạc threatened to prohibit Christianity, he continued to tolerate the Jesuits and their converts. In 1662 he declared Taoism and Buddhism the state religions while outlawing Christianity. Also in November of the same year the old king Le Duy Ky died, and Trịnh Tạc selected 10-year-old Prince Le Duy Vu as king.

In 1663 the Jesuits were banished from north Vietnam. On 13 July 1669 he prohibited foreign vessels to arrive Hanoi, and instead they were docked in Pho Hien, along the Red River. Trịnh Tạc welcomed the first French ship Compagnie des Indes Orientales led by Lambert de la Motte, two priests Jacques de Bourges (1630–1714) and Gabriel Bouchard in Pho Hien. He permitted the French to build a factory at Pho Hien in hope that he would receive more European cannons and to counter the Dutch and Portuguese businesses in Tonkin. In 1672 he allowed the English East India Company to open a factory in Hanoi. Because of his failed campaign in the same year, Trịnh Tạc turned his anger against the Jesuits and expelled Giovanni Filippo Marini in spring 1673.

After peace returned, Confucianism was revived, and power transferred from the military to the literati. The war policy finally was abandoned. Foreign traders now received more negative views and hostilities from the court. The English left Tonkin in 1697, followed by the Dutch in 1700.

== See also ==
- Lê dynasty
- List of Vietnamese dynasties

Vietnamese royalty
Preceded by Trịnh Tráng	Trịnh lords Lord of Tonkin; 1657–1682	Succeeded by Trịnh Căn
