= Lê Uy Mục =

Lê Uy Mục 黎威穆
- Emperor of Đại Việt

Emperor of the Lê dynasty
- Reign: 1505–1510
- Predecessor: Lê Túc Tông
- Successor: Lê Tương Dực
- Born: 5 May 1488
- Died: 20 January 1510 (aged 21)
Names
- Lê Tuấn (黎濬)
Era name and dates
- Đoan Khánh (端慶): 1505–1510
Posthumous name
- Mẫn Lệ công (愍厲公), later Uy Mục hoàng đế (威穆皇帝)
- House: Lê dynasty
- Father: Lê Hiến Tông
- Mother: Lady Nguyễn Thị Cận

Lê Uy Mục (chữ Hán: 黎威穆; 5 May 1488 – 20 January 1510), also called Lê Tuấn (黎濬), was the eighth emperor of the later Lê dynasty of Vietnam. He was the second son of Emperor Lê Hiến Tông and the elder half-brother of his direct predecessor, Emperor Lê Túc Tông.

Lê Uy Mục was portrayed in Đại Việt's historical annals as an arrogant and ruthless monarch. His reign oversaw the beginning of the decline of the Đại Việt empire, having been prosperous and powerful during the able reigns of Lê Thánh Tông, Lê Hiến Tông and Lê Túc Tông. Annalists during the Revival Lê dynasty recorded him as having killed many people including his grandmother and two of his ministers, as well as many imperial princes. He also wasted his energy in excessive drinking and sexual activities. It was alleged that some Ming ambassadors, having examined the emperor Lê Uy Mục's aggressive physical appearance, labelled him as Demon King (Quỷ vương, 鬼王).

In 1504, Uy Mục arrested his cousin Lê Oanh, son of Hiến Tông's younger brother Lê Tân. Oanh eventually escaped southwards to Thanh Hóa, the homeland of the imperial house. Here, Oanh organized a rebellion against the government. After hard fighting, rebel forces approached the imperial capital Thăng Long and killed the emperor, ending a short reign of only 4 years. Lê Oanh was enthroned as Emperor Lê Tương Dực, who later turned to be another unpopular monarch.

== Biography ==
=== Childhood ===
The only primary source about Lê Uy Mục's life was contained in the Đại Việt sử ký toàn thư, the official historical chronicle of Đại Việt during the Lê dynasty. The chronicle was first compiled in 1479 by Ngô Sĩ Liên, a chronicler in the court of Lê Thánh Tông, Uy Mục's grandfather. After 1479, the works were continually supplemented by other Đại Việt's chroniclers. Parts including details about Lê Uy Mục was added by the minister Vũ Quỳnh in 1511. According to the chronicle, Uy Mục's real name was Lê Tuấn (黎濬). He was born on 5 May 1488 during the reign of his grandfather Lê Thánh Tông. He was the second son of Crown Prince Lê Tranh and Lady Nguyễn Thị Cận. His mother was originally a maid of Consort Nguyễn Kính Phi. She died after giving birth to him and he was adopted by Consort Nguyễn Kính Phi.

Because his mother was a maid, during his childhood he was always be looked down on by his grandmother, Empress Trường Lạc. In 1496, Emperor Lê Thánh Tông died, probably being poisoned by Empress Trường Lạc. Lê Tuấn's father Lê Tranh ascended to the throne, known to chroniclers as Emperor Lê Hiến Tông. In early 1499, several government ministers including Lê Vĩnh and Lê Năng Nhượng persuaded Hiến Tông to choose an heir in order to maintain the dynasty's and the nation's security and sustainability. Hiến Tông agreed, but he despised his two eldest sons, Lê Tuân and Lê Tuấn, for being intellectually and morally unsuited for the throne. The emperor eventually designed his third son, Lê Thuần (mothered by Consort Nguyễn Hoàn) as Crown Prince.

In 1504, Emperor Lê Hiến Tông died at the age of 44. Crown Prince Lê Thuần was enthroned as Emperor Lê Túc Tông. Having reigned for only six months, Túc Tông felt critically ill in December 1504. Realising that he could not pass the disease, Túc Tông designated his elder brother Lê Tuấn as his successor. On 12 January 1505, Túc Tông died at the age of 17. Lê Tuấn's grandmother, who had become Grand Empress Dowager Trường Lạc since the death of Hiến Tông, despised Tuấn's origin as son of a maid. She preferred another prince in royal family. With the help from Nguyễn Kính Phi and Nguyễn Nhữ Vy, finally he could become the next emperor of Lê dynasty, Emperor Lê Uy Mục, in 1505.

=== Reign ===
Lê Uy Mục was portrayed by Neo-Confucianist chroniclers as being deeply contrasted to his predecessors Lê Thánh Tông, Lê Hiến Tông and Lê Túc Tông, who closely followed Neo-Confucianist principles in governing the nation. In 1505, Uy Mục ordered his servants to assassinate his grandmother, Grand Empress Dowager Trường Lạc. The Grand Empress Dowager was killed at the age of 65.

Also, he launched a bloody purge to kill all of the officials serving in the royal court who did not support him to become the emperor, such as Đàm Văn Lễ, Nguyễn Quang Bật and also one of the supported officials, Nguyễn Nhữ Vy. He investigated all of the princes in the royal family and killed anyone who was considered as dangers for his position.

He also ordered to massacre the Cham people who served as slaves for government officials. He spent almost every night in the palace drinking with beauties, and whenever he got drunk, he killed these ladies.

The power fell into consort kin. People from Nguyễn clan of Nguyễn Kính Phi, Nguyễn clan of Lady Nguyễn Thị Cận and Trần clan of Empress Trần Thị Tùng were saucy but had a lot of power. They made much corruption, riffled poverty of people and also killed a lot of people including court officials and normal people.

During his era, many people became afraid of his despotic rule.

=== Dethronement ===
Prince Lê Oanh, after escaping from the bloody purge, together with a group of officials - notably Nguyễn Văn Lang plotted again the despotic ruler. They launched a coup since December 1509. Emperor Lê Uy Mục knew that, he killed Lê Oanh's parents but still lost in the battle. The Emperor was deposed and requested to suicide. He died on December 1, 1509 (in Chinese calendar) (20 January 1510 in Gregory calendar), and was buried at the tomb of An lăng.

Prince Lê Oanh became the successor, Emperor Lê Tương Dực.

== Family ==
- Father: Lê Hiến Tông
- Mother: Lady Nguyễn Thị Cận
- Adoptive mother: Nguyễn Kính Phi
- Consort(s) :
1. Empress Trần Thị Tùng of Trần clan (威穆皇后陳氏)
2. Consort Trần Thị Trúc, younger sister of Empress Trần Thị Tùng
3. Royal Consort Lê thị

Preceded by Lê Túc Tông	Emperor of Vietnam; 1504–1509	Succeeded by Lê Tương Dực
