= Lê Túc Tông =

Lê Túc Tông 黎肅宗
- Emperor of Đại Việt

Emperor of Đại Việt
- Reign: 17 July 1504 – 12 January 1505
- Predecessor: Lê Hiến Tông
- Successor: Lê Uy Mục
- Born: 6 September 1488
- Died: 12 January 1505 (aged 16)
Names
- Lê Thuần (黎㵮)
Era name and dates
- Thái Trinh (泰貞): 1504-1505
Posthumous name
- Chiêu Nghĩa Hiển Nhân Ôn Cung Uyên Mặc Hiếu Doãn Cung Khâm Hoàng đế (昭義顯仁溫恭淵默惇孝允恭欽皇帝)
Temple name
- Túc Tông (肅宗)
- House: Lê dynasty
- Father: Lê Hiến Tông
- Mother: Nguyễn Hoàn

Lê Túc Tông (黎肅宗; 6 September 1488 – 12 January 1505) was, from 17 July 1504 until 12 January 1505, the 7th emperor of the later Lê dynasty of Vietnam.

== Biography ==
According to the Đại Việt sử ký toàn thư, the official historical annal of Đại Việt that came into its final form in 1697 during the Revival Lê dynasty, Lê Túc Tông's real name was Lê Thuần (黎㵮). He was born on 6 September 1488 in the imperial capital Đông Kinh, being the third son of crown prince Lê Tranh, the eldest son of emperor Lê Thánh Tông. Thuần's mother was Nguyễn Hoàn, a concubine of Tranh coming from Hưng Yên. In 1497, when Lê Thuần was 8 years old, his grandfather Lê Thánh Tông died and his father Lê Tranh ascended to the throne. The new emperor was known to historical annals as Lê Hiến Tông. In early 1499, several high-ranking officials including Lê Vĩnh and Lê Năng Nhượng persuaded Hiến Tông to choose an heir in order to maintain the dynasty's and the nation's security and sustainability. Hiến Tông agreed; and although the emperor had two elder sons: Lê Tuân and Lê Tuấn, Lê Thuần was designed as crown prince due to his deep interest in intellectuality and Neo-Confucianism, which caused Hiến Tông to perceive him as being far superior to his two older brothers.

In 1504, Lê Hiến Tông died at the age of 44. The 17 year old Lê Thuần inherited the throne. The Confucian annalists portrayed him as a relatively good emperor who released many prisoners, stopping several construction works that posed heavy burden on his subjects, as well as reducing tributes from vassals and holding high-ranking officials in high regard. He was also said to have maintained harmony in the court and the whole country. In the other hand, the annals also recorded a revolt broke in Cao Bằng, led by Đoàn Thế Nùng against the government. Lê Thuần sent troops to Cao Bằng, defeating and killing Đoàn Thế Nùng along with 500 rebels.

The reign of Lê Thuần lasted for only six months. In December 1502, immediately after completing the burial process for his father, he felt critically ill. Understanding that he could not pass the disease, Lê Thuần designated his second elder brother, Lê Tuấn, as the apparent heir. Not late after that, the emperor died and Lê Tuấn succeeded him as the 8th emperor of the Lê dynasty. The new emperor and court officials designed the deceased emperor's temple name as Túc Tông. Lê Túc Tông's death could be seen as the beginning of the decline of the Lê dynasty, as Lê Tuấn soon proved to be a cruel and extravagant monarch who killed many imperial members and employed corrupt officials.

When Túc Tông came to the throne, he declared that in the next year (1505), the era name will be changed from his father's old one, Cảnh Thống (景統) to Thái Trinh (泰貞). However, Túc Tông died before 1504 was over; so, throughout his short reign, he still used the era name Cảnh Thống and the name Thái Trinh was never put into use. His successor, Lê Tuấn changed the era name to Đoan Khánh.

| Preceded by Lê Hiến Tông | Emperor of Vietnam six months in 1504 | Succeeded by Lê Uy Mục |
