= Lê Kính Tông =

Lê Kính Tông 黎敬宗
- Emperor of Đại Việt

Emperor of the Revival Lê dynasty
- Reign: 1599–1619
- Predecessor: Lê Thế Tông
- Successor: Lê Thần Tông
- Regent: Trịnh Tùng
- Born: 1588
- Died: 23 June 1619 (aged 30–31)
Names
- Lê Duy Tân (黎維新)
Era name and dates
- Thận Đức (慎德): 1600–1601; Hoằng Định (弘定): 1601–1619
Posthumous name
- Hiển Nhân Dụ Khánh Tuy Phúc Huệ Hoàng đế (顯仁裕慶綏福惠皇帝)
Temple name
- Kính Tông (敬宗)
- House: Lê dynasty
- Father: Lê Thế Tông
- Mother: Ý Đức hoàng thái hậu

Lê Kính Tông (chữ Hán: 黎敬宗, 1588 – 23 June 1619), also known as Lê Duy Tân (黎維新) was the 16th emperor of the Vietnamese Later Lê dynasty reigning from 1599 to 1619. He served as a figurehead monarch while Lord Trịnh Tùng held full authority over the government and the army. In 1619, Kính Tông conspired with Trịnh Xuân to remove Trịnh Tùng from power. The plot failed and the emperor was killed.

Preceded by Lê Thế Tông	Emperor of Vietnam; 1533–1548	Succeeded by Lê Thần Tông
