= Lê Thần Tông =

Lê Thần Tông 黎神宗
- Emperor of Đại Việt

Emperor of Đại Việt
- Reign: 1619–1643
- Predecessor: Lê Kính Tông
- Successor: Lê Chân Tông
- Regent: Trịnh Tùng (1619–1623); Trịnh Tráng (1623–1643)
- Reign: 1649–1662
- Predecessor: Lê Chân Tông
- Successor: Lê Huyền Tông
- Regent: Trịnh Tráng (1649–1657); Trịnh Tạc (1657–1662)

Retired Emperor of Revival Lê dynasty
- Reign: 1643–1649
- Born: 19 November, 1607; Đông Kinh, Đại Việt
- Died: 2 November 1662; Đông Kinh, Đại Việt
- Burial: Quần Ngọc Tomb (群玉陵)
Names
- Lê Duy Kỳ (黎維祺)
Era name and dates
- Vĩnh Tộ (永祚): 1619–29; Đức Long (德隆): 1629–35; Dương Hòa (陽和): 1635–43; Khánh Đức (慶德): 1649–53; Thịnh Đức (盛德): 1653–58; Vĩnh Thọ (永壽): 1658–62; Vạn Khánh (萬慶): 9/1662: 1662
Posthumous name
- Uyên Hoàng đế (淵皇帝)
Temple name
- Thần Tông (神宗)
- House: Revival Lê dynasty
- Father: Lê Kính Tông
- Mother: Trịnh Thị Ngọc Trinh

Lê Thần Tông (黎神宗, 19 November 1607 – 2 November 1662) was the 17th emperor of Vietnamese Later Lê dynasty.

== Biography ==
Lê Thần Tông's birth name is Lê Duy Kỳ (黎維祺). He was born in 1607 and reigned in 1619–1643 following Lê Kính Tông, was interrupted by the reign of Lê Chân Tông 1643–1649, then reigned again 1649–1662 and was succeeded by Lê Huyền Tông. He was a figurehead emperor with lords Trịnh Tùng, who ruled 1570–1623, then Trịnh Tráng who ruled in 1623–1657, and Trịnh Tạc who ruled 1657–1682. At this time the Tonkin was still engaged in military campaigns against Nguyễn Lords in the south.

== Family ==
Consorts and their respective issues :

1. Empress consort Trịnh Thị Ngọc Trúc (ex-wife of duke Lê Trụ)
2. Noble consort Nguyễn Thị Ngọc Bạch
  1. Prince Lê Duy Hựu
3. Consort Phạm Thị Ngọc Hậu
  1. First crown prince Lê Duy Vũ
4. Consort Lê Thị Ngọc Hoàn
  1. Prince Lê Duy Cối
5. Lady Nguyễn Thị Ngọc Tấn
  1. Prince Lê Duy Hạp
6. Lady Nguyễn Thị Nhân
  1. Princess Lê Thị Ngọc Thỉnh
7. Lady Nguyễn Thị Sinh
  1. Princess Lê Thị Ngọc Hài
8. Lady Nguyễn Thị Vĩ
  1. Princess Lê Thị Ngọc Điều
9. Lady Trịnh Thị
  1. Princess Lê Thị Ngọc Triện
10. Lady Trần Thị Lãng
  1. Princess Lê Thị Ngọc An
11. Lady Ourou-san (Korea-born Japanese woman)
  1. Princess Lê Thị Ngọc Ngọc

Moreover, 4 foster children : Princess Lê Thị Ngọc Duyên, second crown prince Lê Duy Tào, prince Lê Duy Lương and Các Hắc Sinh. Các Hắc Sinh or Willem Carel Hartsinck was the chief merchant in Tonkin from 1637 - 1641, who in Amsterdam reported to the Gentlemen XVII that “the ‘perfidious nation’ of “Tonkin”, if they ever were victorious over “Quinam”, would certainly not make good her promises to the Company, and that the Company, therefore, had better leave the subjugation of Quinam to the Tonkinese themselves”.

Preceded by Lê Kính Tông	Emperor of Vietnam; 1619–1643, 1649–1662	Succeeded by Lê Huyền Tông
