= Lê Hiến Tông =

Lê Hiến Tông 黎憲宗
- Emperor of Đại Việt

Emperor of Lê dynasty
- Reign: 1498–1504
- Predecessor: Lê Thánh Tông
- Successor: Lê Túc Tông
- Born: 10 August 1461
- Died: 24 May 1504 (aged 44)
- Issue: Lê Túc Tông, Le Uy Muc
Names
- Lê Tranh (黎鏳)
Era name and dates
- Cảnh Thống (景統): 1498–1504
Posthumous name
- Thể Thiên Ngưng Đạo Mậu Đức Chí Nhân Chiêu Văn Thiệu Vũ Tuyên Triết Khâm Thành Chương Hiếu Duệ Hoàng Đế (體天凝道懋德至仁昭文紹武宣哲欽聖彰孝睿皇帝)
Temple name
- Hiến Tông (憲宗)
- House: Lê dynasty
- Father: Lê Thánh Tông
- Mother: Nguyễn Thị Huyên

Lê Hiến Tông (chữ Hán: 黎憲宗, 10 August 1461 – 24 May 1504) was the 6th emperor of Vietnam's Lê dynasty reigning over Đại Việt from 1497 to 1504.

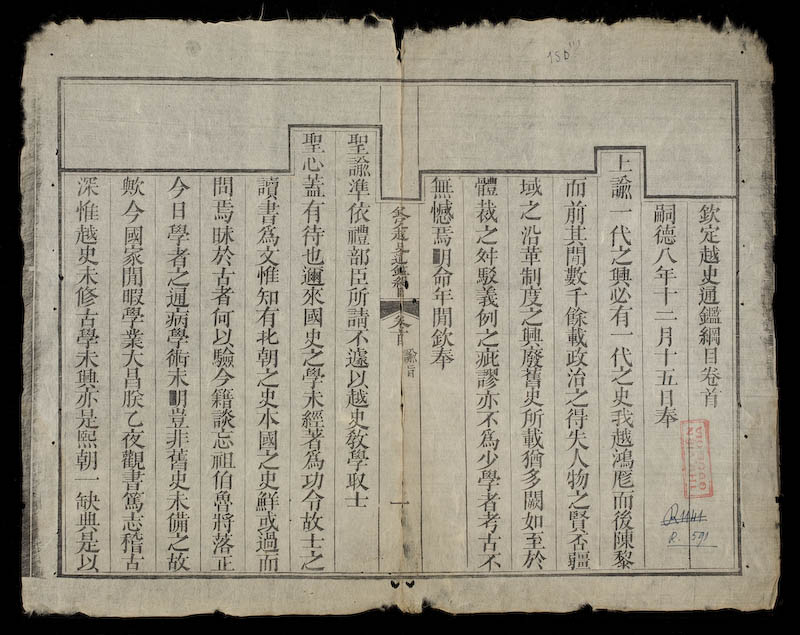
Khâm định Việt sử Thông giám cương mục (欽定越史通鑑綱目) published in Nguyễn dynasty 1884 by order of Emperor Tự Đức

He promulgated the legal code of his father Lê Thánh Tông (1442–1497) in the Khâm định Việt sử Thông giám cương mục. His death in 1504 marked the beginning of the crisis in sixteenth-century Đại Việt which continued eighty-eight years until the Trịnh Lords drove the Mạc dynasty from the capital Thăng Long.

Preceded by Lê Thánh Tông	Emperor of Đại Việt; 1497–1504	Succeeded by Lê Túc Tông
