= Sukjong =

Sukjong (肅宗) is the temple name of several Korean kings. It can refer to:

- Sukjong of Goryeo (1095–1105)
- Sukjong of Joseon (1674–1720)
