= Lê Huyền Tông =

Lê Huyền Tông 黎玄宗
- Emperor of Đại Việt

Emperor of Đại Việt
- Reign: 1662–1671
- Predecessor: Lê Thần Tông
- Successor: Lê Gia Tông
- Regent: Trịnh Tạc
- Born: 1654; Đông Kinh, Đại Việt
- Died: 16 November 1671 (aged 16–17); Đông Kinh, Đại Việt
- Burial: Quả Thịnh Tomb (果盛陵)
Names
- Lê Duy Vũ (黎維禑)
Era name and dates
- Cảnh Trị (景治): 1662–1671
Posthumous name
- Mục Hoàng đế (穆皇帝)
Temple name
- Huyền Tông (玄宗)
- House: House of Lê
- Father: Lê Thần Tông
- Mother: Phạm Thị Ngọc Hậu

Lê Huyền Tông (黎玄宗, 1654 – 16 November 1671) was the 19th emperor of Vietnamese Later Lê dynasty.

== Biography ==
Lê Huyền Tông's birth name is Lê Duy Vũ (黎維禑) and courtesy name Duy Hi (維禧). He was born in 1654 and reigned from 1662 to 1671. He was a figurehead emperor under the power of lord Trịnh Tạc who ruled 1657-82.

After his coronation, he established diplomatic relations with Qing dynasty in China. He also prohibited people to become Christians.

== Family ==
Consorts and their respective issues :

- Queen Trịnh Thị Ngọc Ang (鄭氏玉𣖮)

Preceded by Lê Thần Tông	Emperor of Vietnam; 1662–1671	Succeeded by Lê Gia Tông
