= Vietnamese calligraphy =

Calligraphic tradition of Vietnam, in various scripts

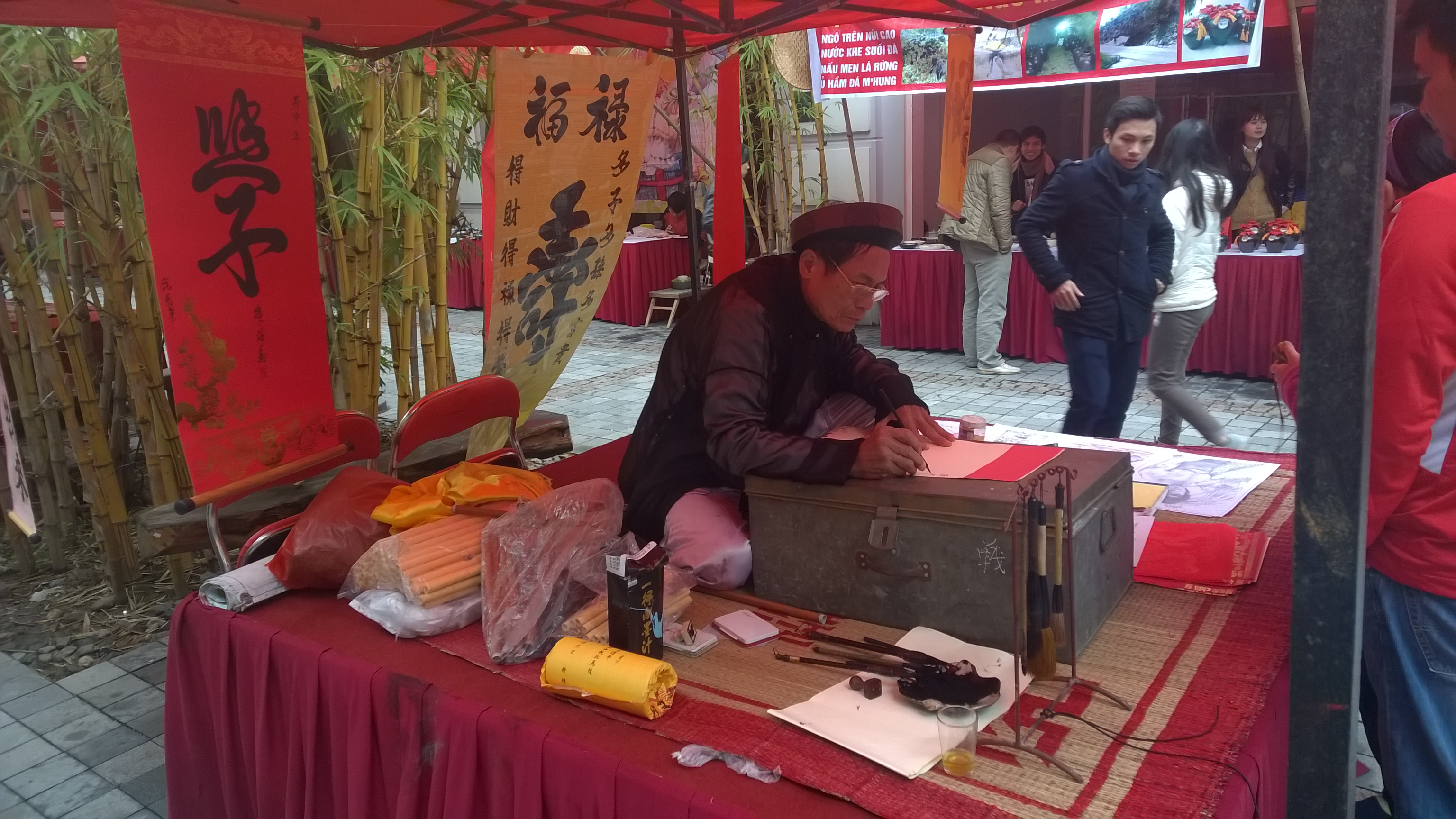
A Vietnamese calligraphist practicing calligraphy.

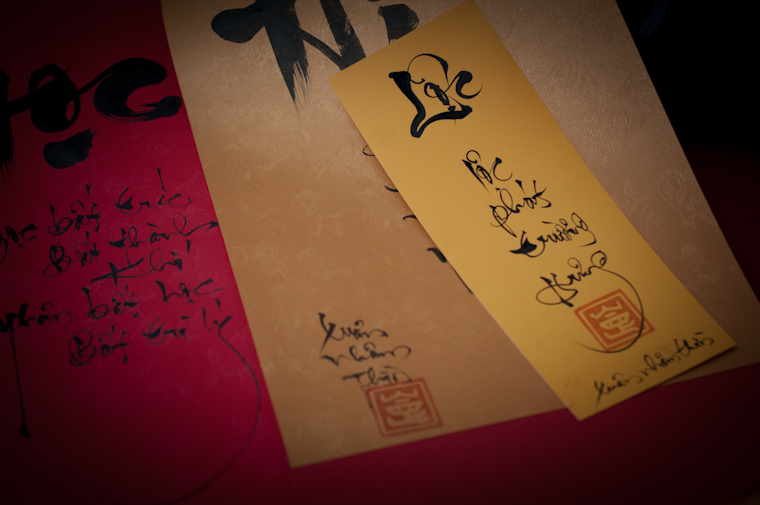
Vietnamese calligraphy in the Vietnamese alphabet, specifically thảo thư.

Vietnamese calligraphy (Vietnamese alphabet: Thư pháp Việt Nam, chữ Hán: 書法越南) is a form of calligraphic traditions expressed in two historical Vietnamese writing systems, chữ Hán (Chinese characters) and chữ Nôm (Vietnamese-derived characters), collectively known as chữ Hán Nôm. Today, however, the modern calligraphic tradition in Vietnam is based on the Latin-based Vietnamese alphabet, which is known as Chữ quốc ngữ. Historically, calligraphers mostly used the chữ Hán Nôm, then due to the adoption of the Latin-based Chữ quốc ngữ, modern Vietnamese calligraphy also uses Latin script.

Traditional Vietnamese calligraphy is strongly affected by that of China. Chữ Hán was often used as a literary language in ancient Vietnam, and as a result, Vietnamese calligraphy also used to follow Chinese calligraphy’s standard and used chữ Hán in many of its writings. For example, during the Lý dynasty, its style was similar to China’s Tang dynasty (618–907). During the Trần dynasty, it was influenced strongly by China’s Song (960–1279) and Yuan (1271–1368) dynasties.

Nonetheless, over time, Vietnam developed its own styles of calligraphy historically for writing both Chữ Hán and Chữ Nôm. In the later Lê dynasty, Vietnam developed a unique style of calligraphy called Nam tự (lit. 'southern script', 南字) by Phạm Đình Hổ (範廷琥) in his book Vũ Trung Tùy Bút ('Written on Rainy Days', 雨中隨筆). It was first used in bureaucracy only but later became popular for all writing purposes. It was also called Lệnh thư (lit. 'script for decrees', 令書) in Việt Sử Toát Yếu ('Vietnamese History and Compendium', 越史撮要) because of its initial bureaucratic characteristic.

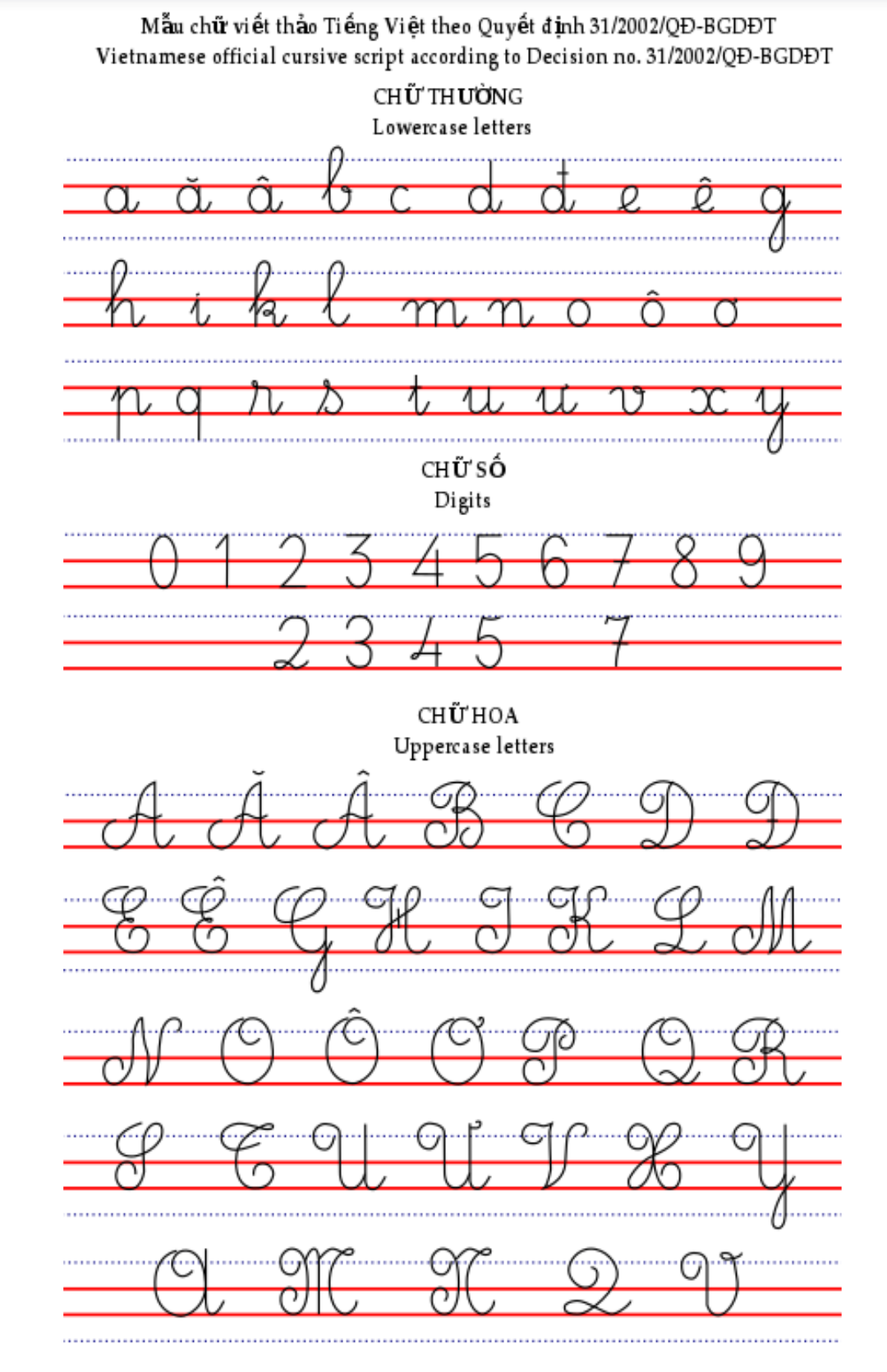
Cursive Vietnamese

Chữ quốc ngữ calligraphy gained popularity during the New Poetry and Free Poetry Movements, due to the increasing popularity of using the Vietnamese vernacular, as well as influence from French literature. Modern Vietnamese calligraphy is influenced by modern Latin cursive but is written using the calligraphy brush, rather than quill or reed pens as is done in Western calligraphy. Vietnamese calligraphy can be used to write poems, festive banners, signages, and so on.

== Historic Vietnamese calligraphy ==
A royal edict issued during the reign of Lê Chân Tông (1643–1639), written in Lệnh thư style

A royal edict from the Dương Đức Era (1672–1674) of Lê Gia Tông, written in Lệnh thư style

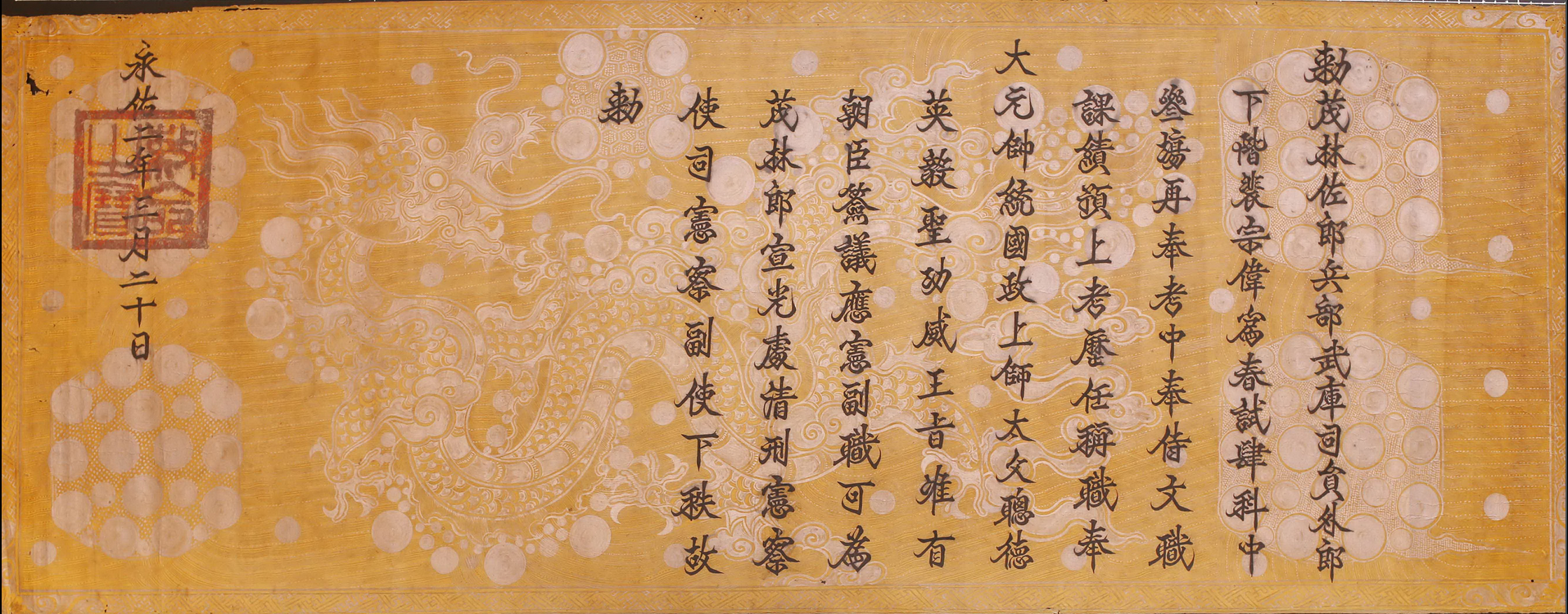
Royal edict dating from the reign of Lê Ý Tông (1735–1740), written in Lệnh thư style

Royal edict dating from the reign of Tự Đức (1848–1883), written in regular script style

== Modern calligraphy ==
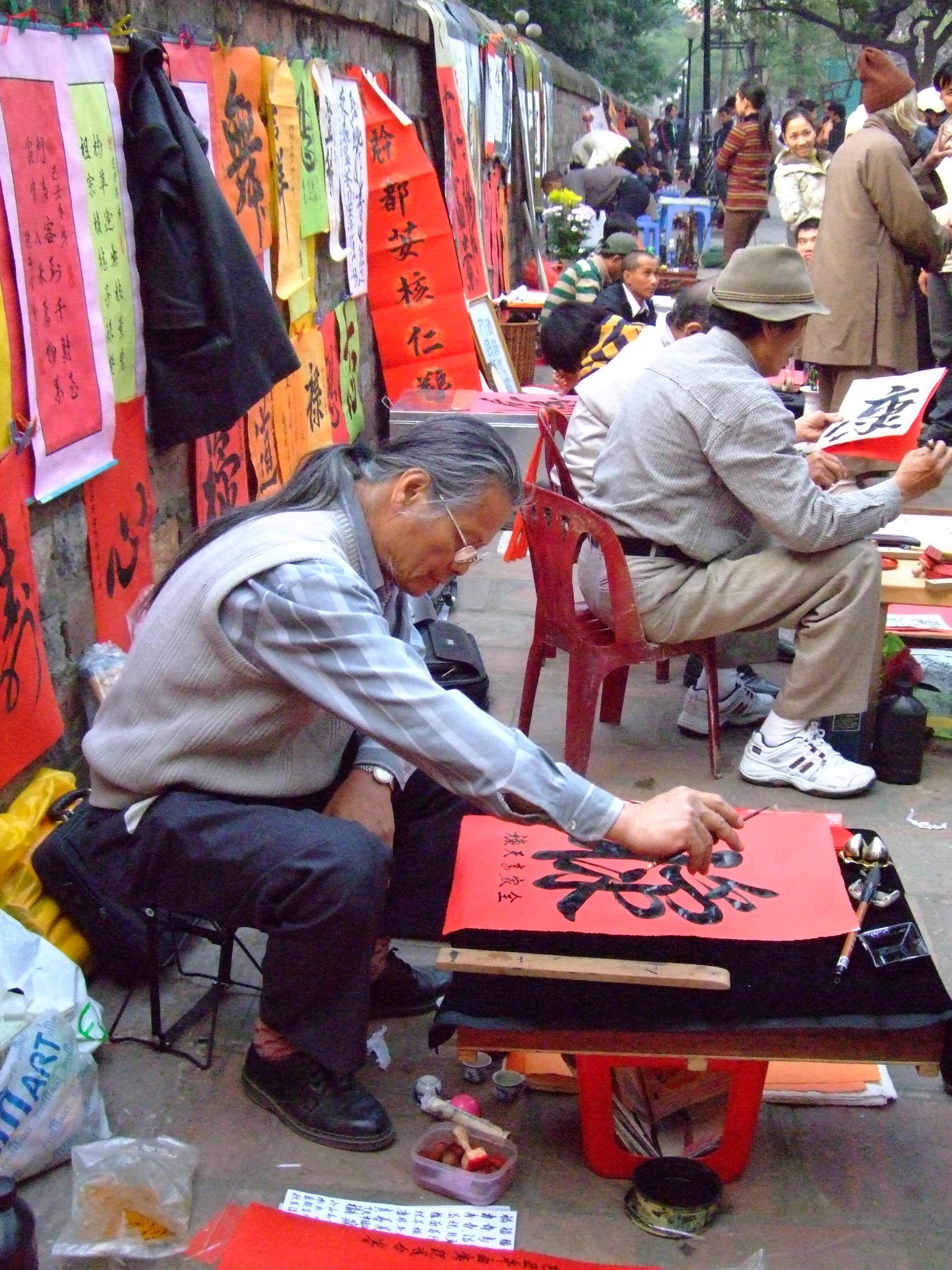
People writing calligraphy on Tết Nguyên Đán in Hanoi.

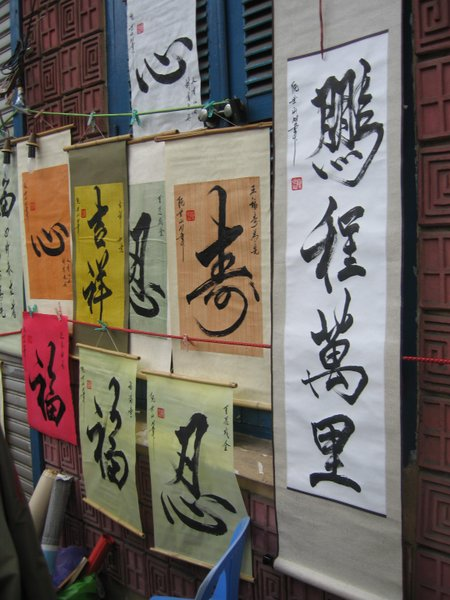
A stall selling chữ Hán calligraphy.

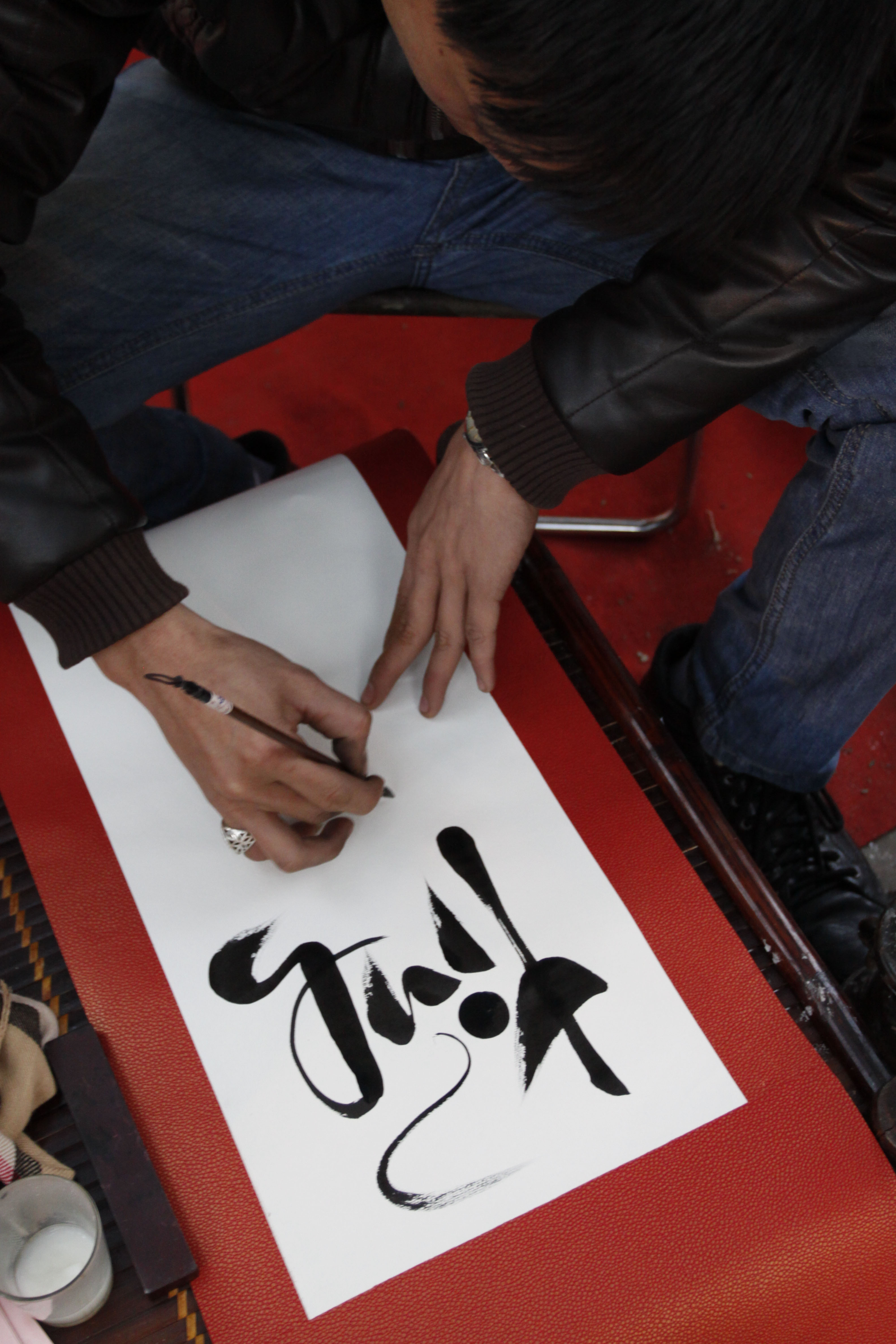
A calligrapher writing Tính, which means 'to ponder' or 'figure out'.

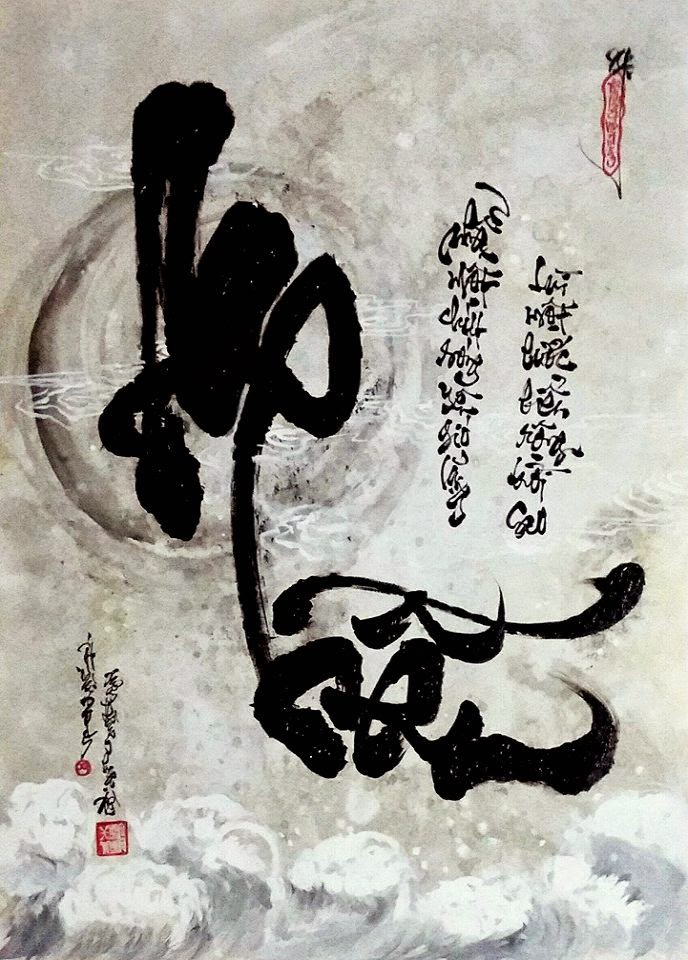
The word Nhẫn.

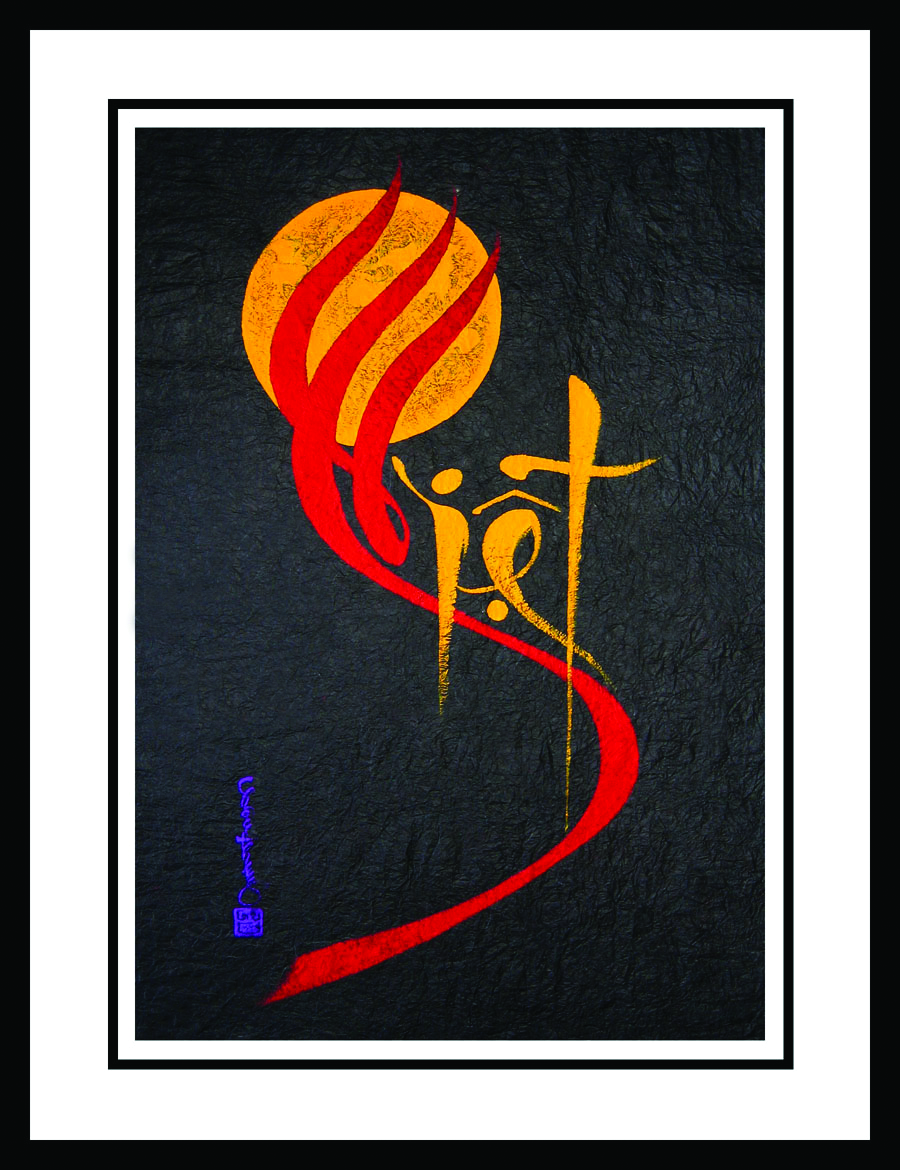
The word Việt.

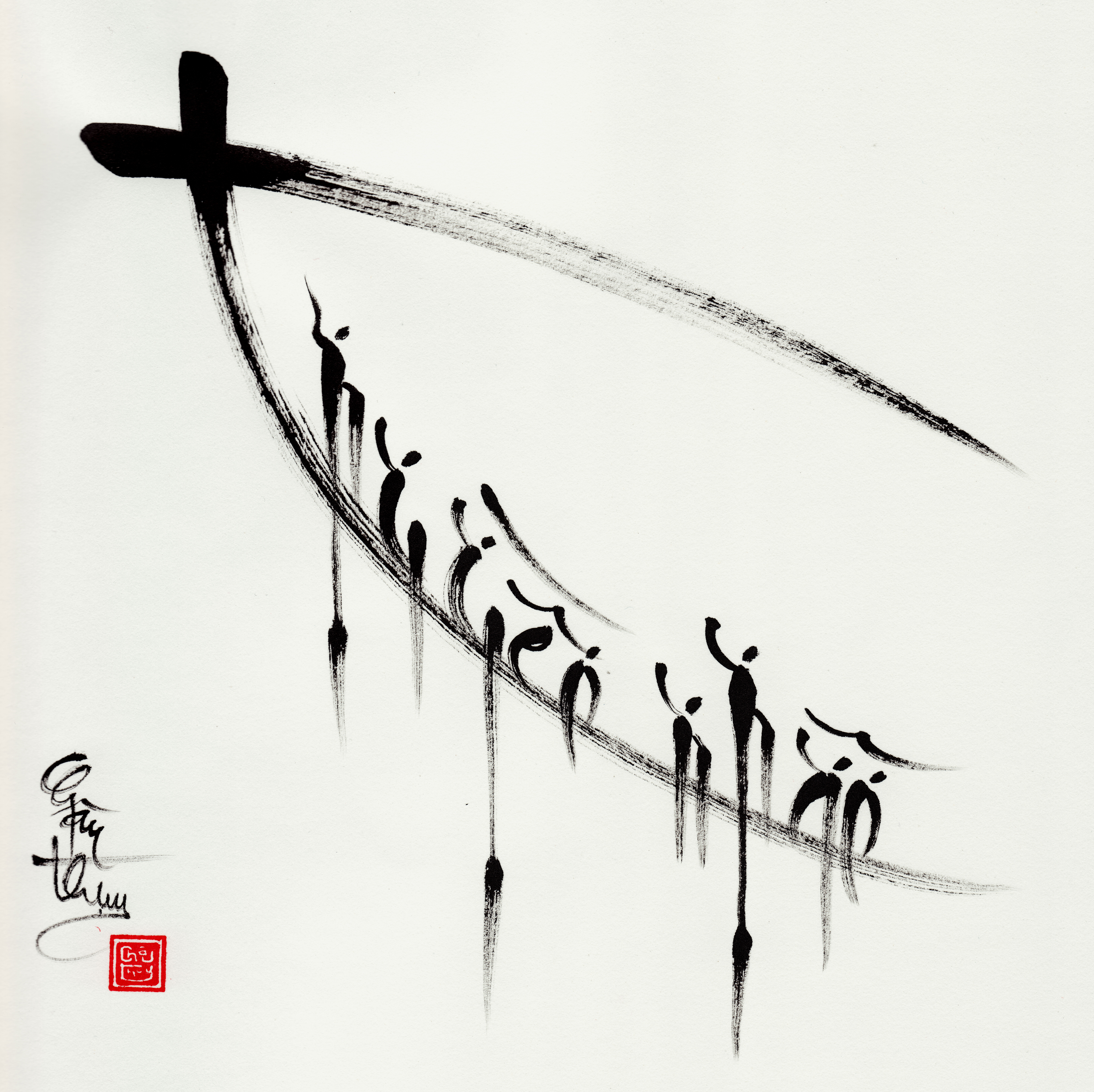
"Boat People": The picture of the people on the boat spell out Thuyền nhân, literally meaning 'Boat People'.

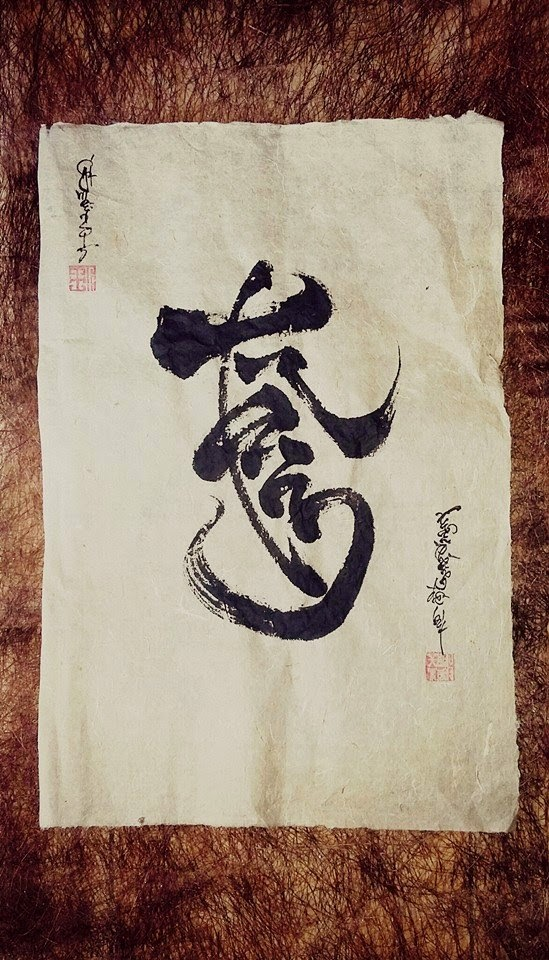
The word Tâm, which can mean 'soul', 'heart', or 'mind'.

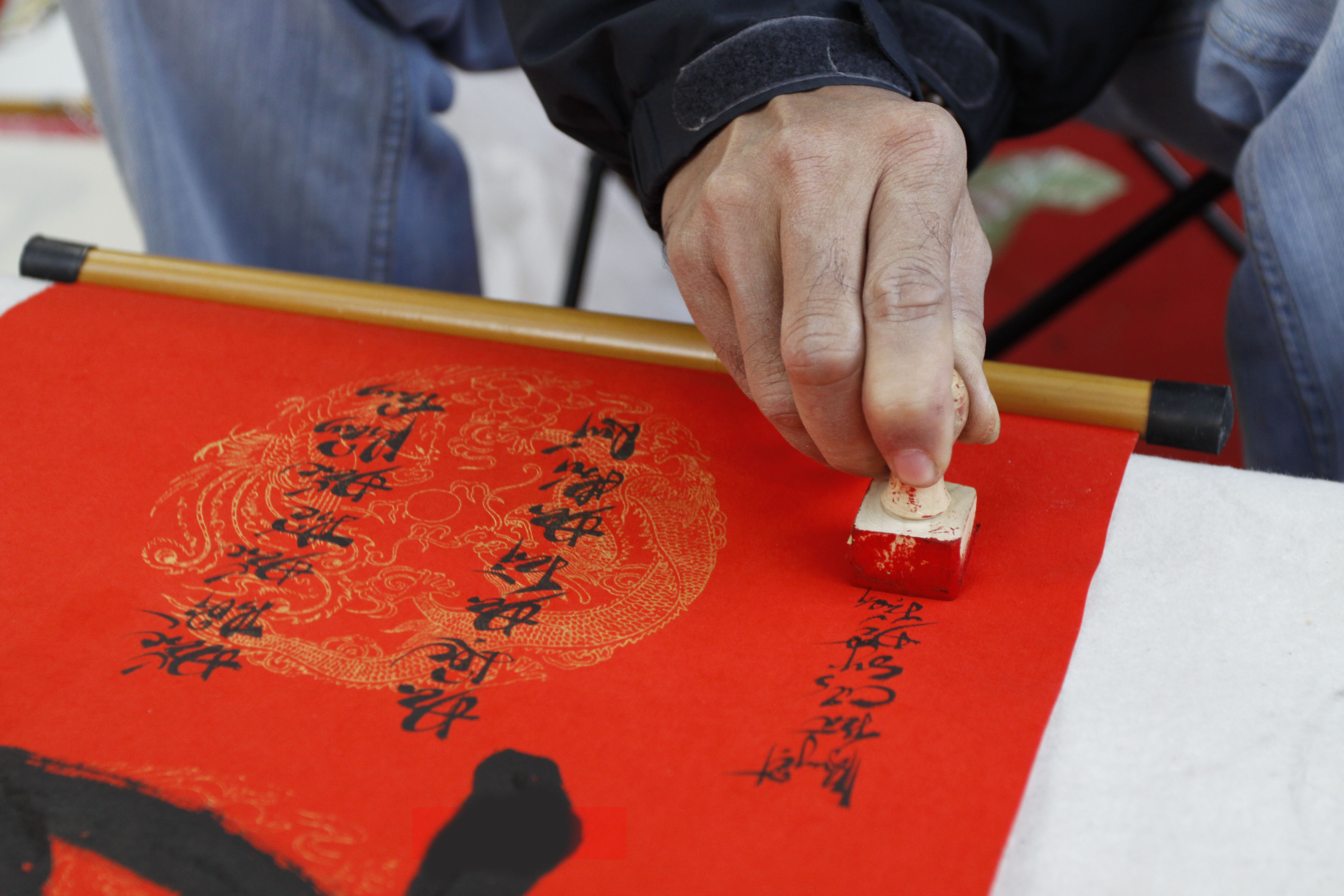
Chữ Quốc-Ngữ written on a scroll.

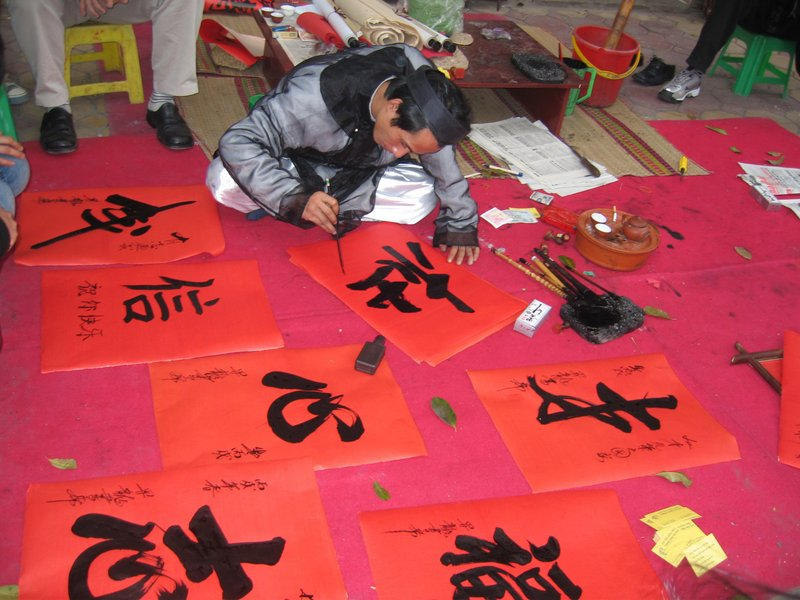
A Vietnamese calligrapher writing chữ Hán and chữ Nôm.

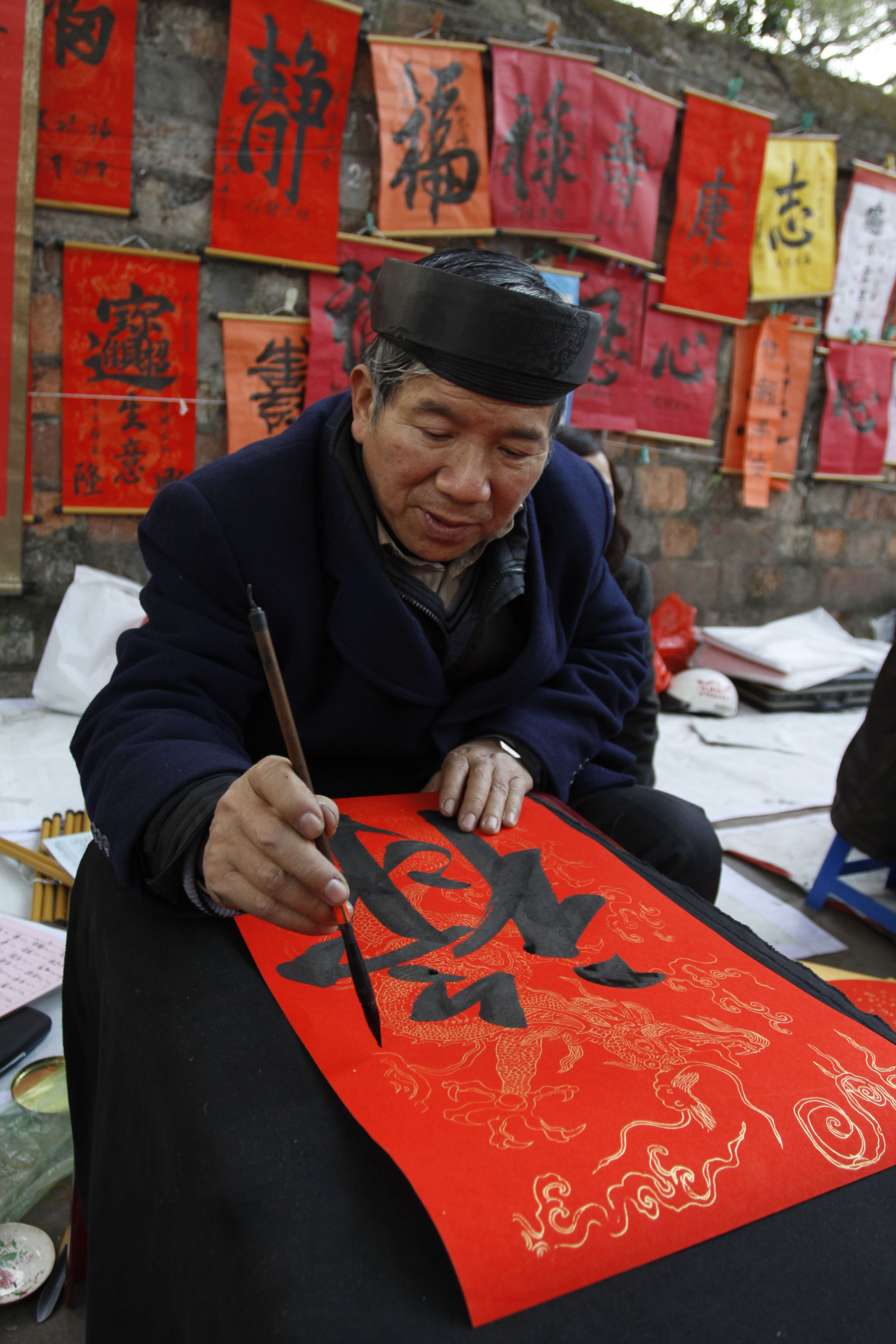
A Vietnamese calligrapher writing 祿 (lộc, 'good fortune') in preparation for Tết at the Temple of Literature, Hanoi.

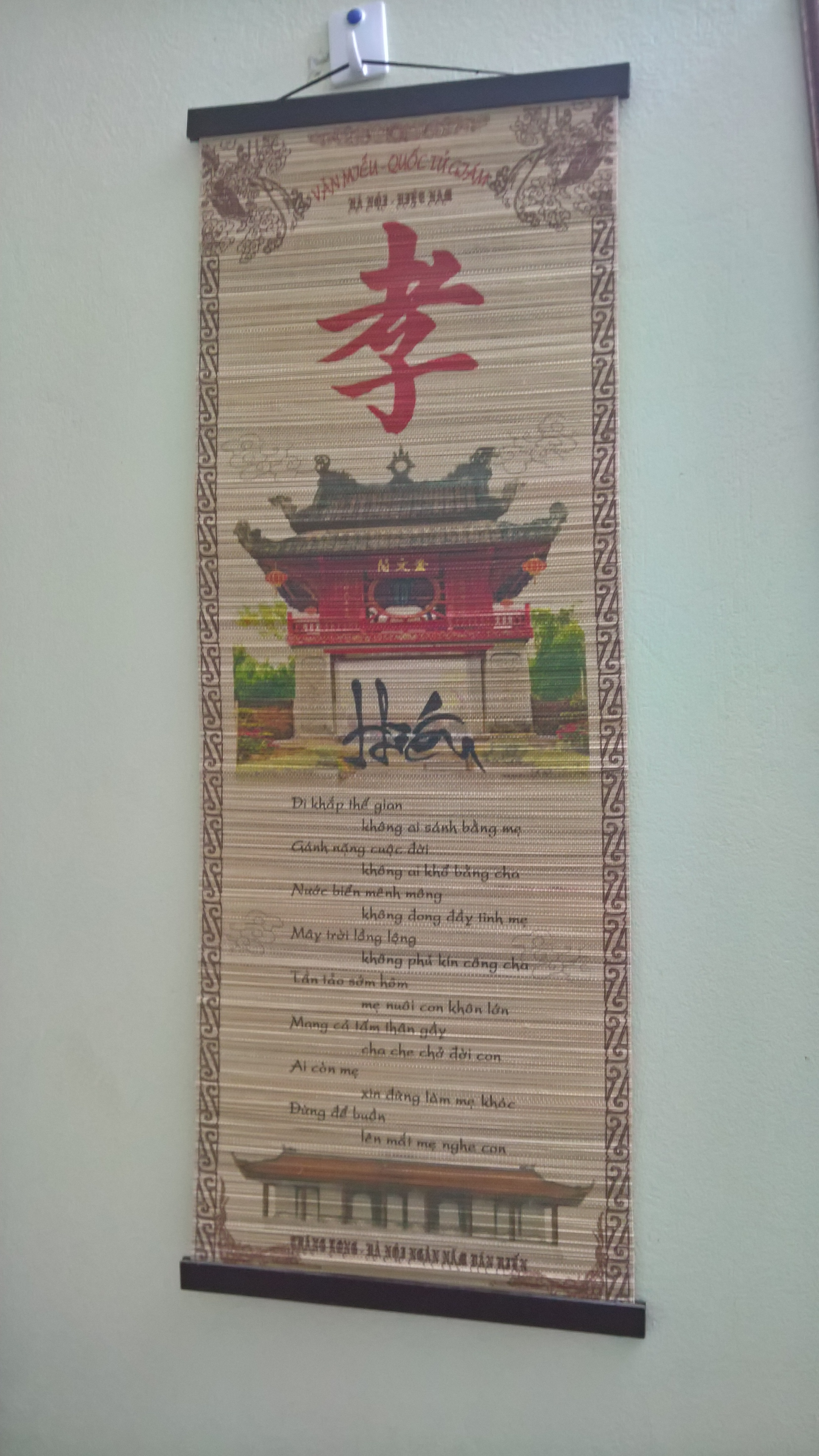
Vietnamese calligraphy from the Temple of Literature.

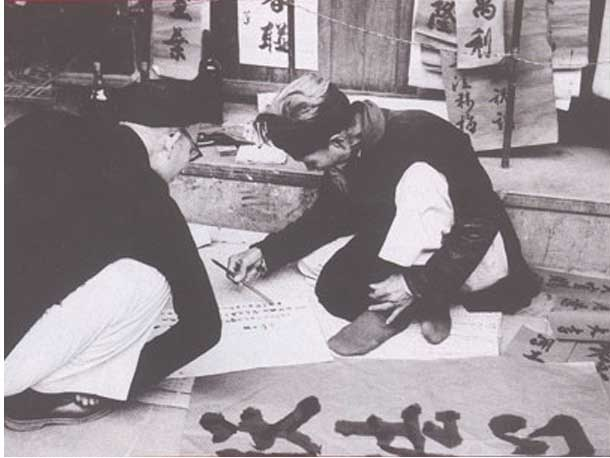
Vietnamese in the Nguyễn Dynasty practicing calligraphy.

== See also ==
- Chinese calligraphy
- History of writing in Vietnam
- Vietnamese alphabet
- Chữ nôm
- Lệnh thư
