= Lệnh thư =

Vietnamese writing script that was used during the Revival Lê dynasty

Lệnh thư 令書
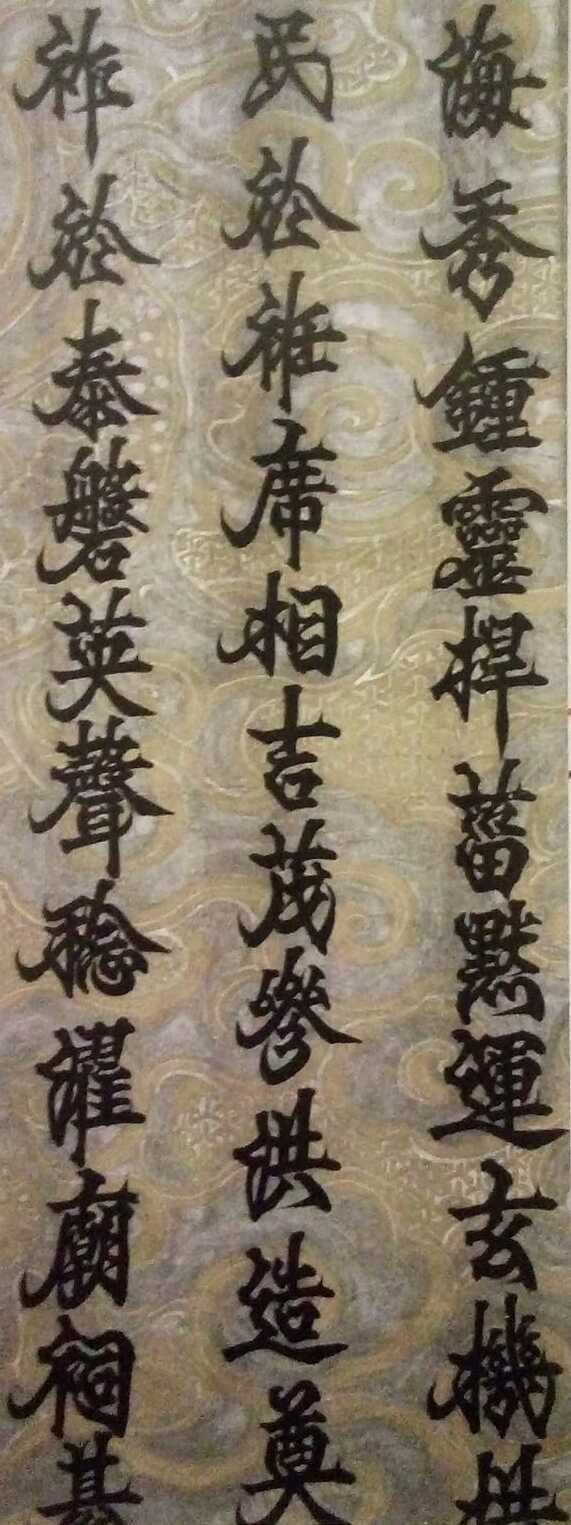
- A close up image of an edict dated 1765 during the reign of Cảnh Hưng, showing Chinese characters written in Lệnh thư.
- Script type: Logographic
- Period: Revival Lê dynasty to 19th century, present (limited usage)
- Languages: Literary Chinese, Vietnamese

Related scripts
- Parent systems: Oracle bone script: Seal script; Clerical script; Cursive script; Lệnh thư
- Child systems: Regular script Chữ Nôm

Lệnh thư

Vietnamese name
- Vietnamese alphabet: Lệnh thư chữ Lệnh; Nam tự chữ Nam
- Hán-Nôm: 令書 𡨸令 南字 𡨸南

Lệnh thư (chữ Hán: 令書; 'edict script') is a writing style for Chinese characters (chữ Hán) and chữ Nôm in Vietnamese calligraphy. It was first developed during the Revival Lê dynasty. It was mainly at first used for official edict by the emperor and by officials in the imperial court, but then became widely used in all of Vietnam. It is not used in other countries that also use Chinese characters (such as China, Korea, and Japan) but rather is unique to Vietnam.

== Characteristics ==
The writing script is defined by its distinct sharp upward hooks. It has strokes that are merged, similar to the style seen in cursive script. Even though the script has merged strokes and is written quickly, it is just as readable as regular script is. In the essay Vũ trung tùy bút (雨中隨筆), Phạm Đình Hổ wrote that the edict script mimics the style of cursive script (chữ thảo, 𡨸草), which is described as imitating the motion of a sword dance. But the edict script underwent changes where strokes were written fluidly with distinctive hooks. He further explains that it seems that it also developed influences from the cursive script and other scripts used traditionally in Chinese calligraphy.

== History ==
The script first appeared during the Lê trung hưng period (Revival Lê dynasty). During the reign of Quang Hưng (光興, Lê Thế Tông), Phạm Đình Hổ also describes the writing of that time period (1599) to be more flamboyant with characters taking on the appearance of 'curved heads and twisted legs'.

== Gallery ==
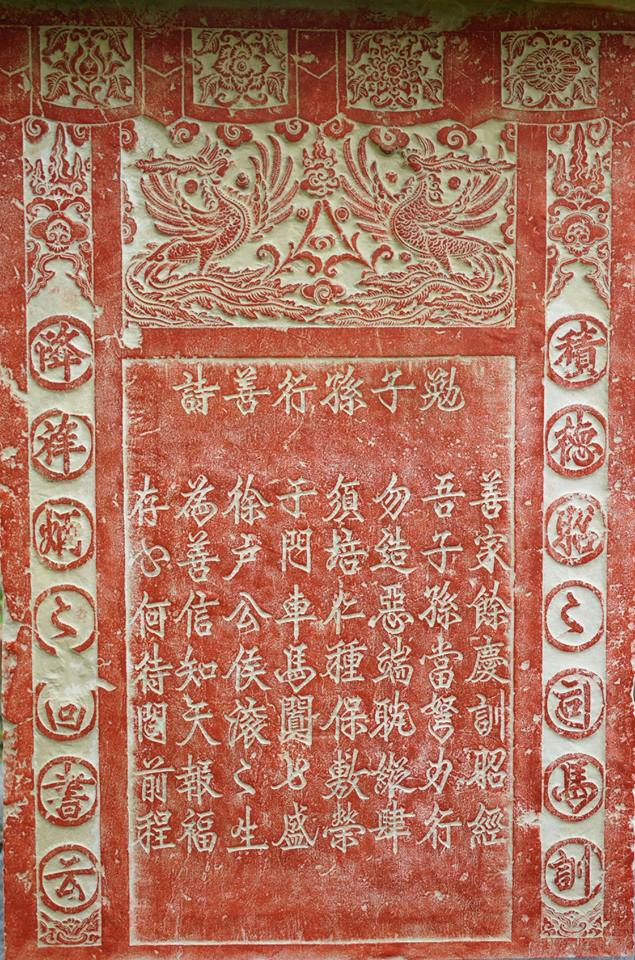
A stele dated from 1660, on it is a poem, Miễn tử tôn hành thiện thi (勉子孫行善詩).

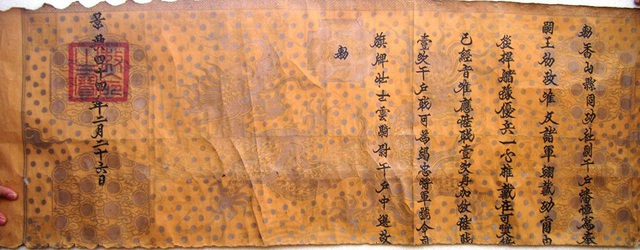
An edict during the reign of emperor Cảnh Hưng 景興.

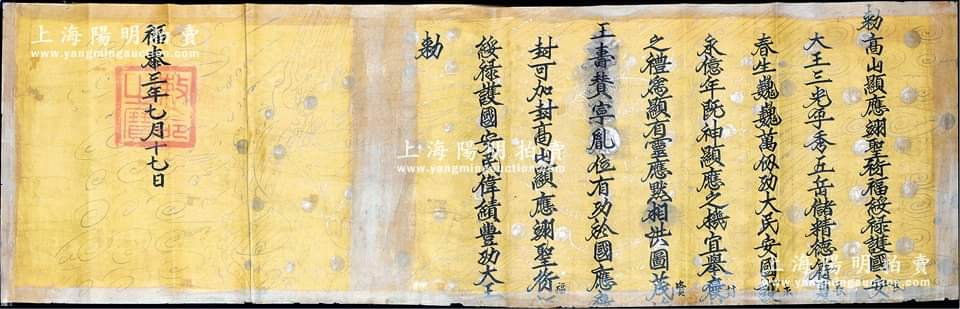
An edict during the reign of emperor Phúc Thái 福泰.

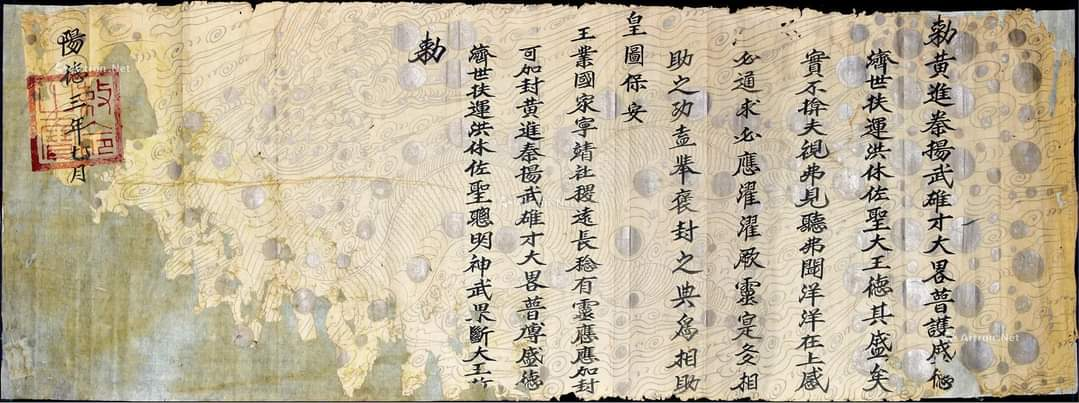
An edict during the reign of emperor Dương Đức 陽德.

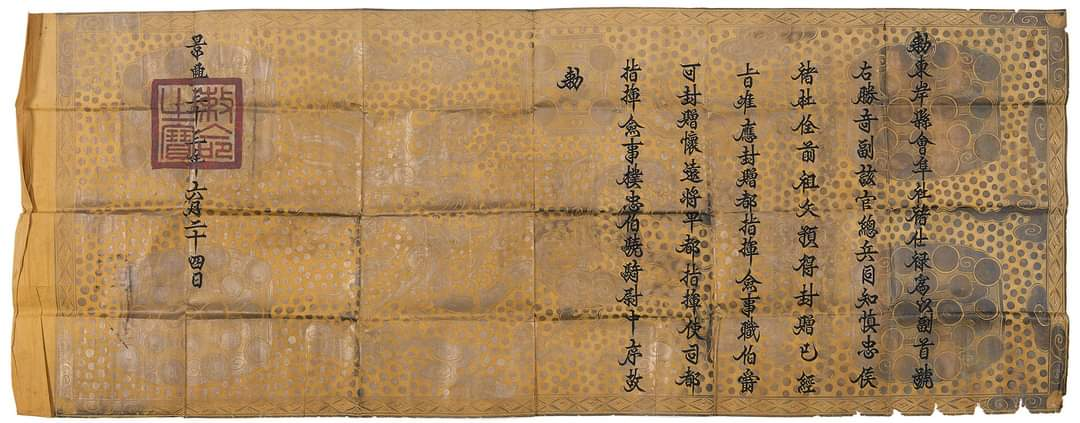
An edict during the reign of emperor Cảnh Hưng 景興.

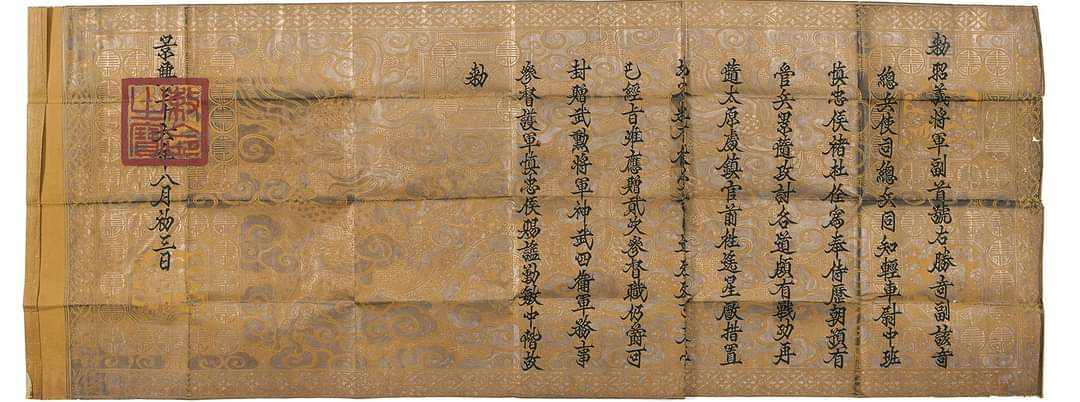
An edict during the reign of emperor Cảnh Hưng 景興.

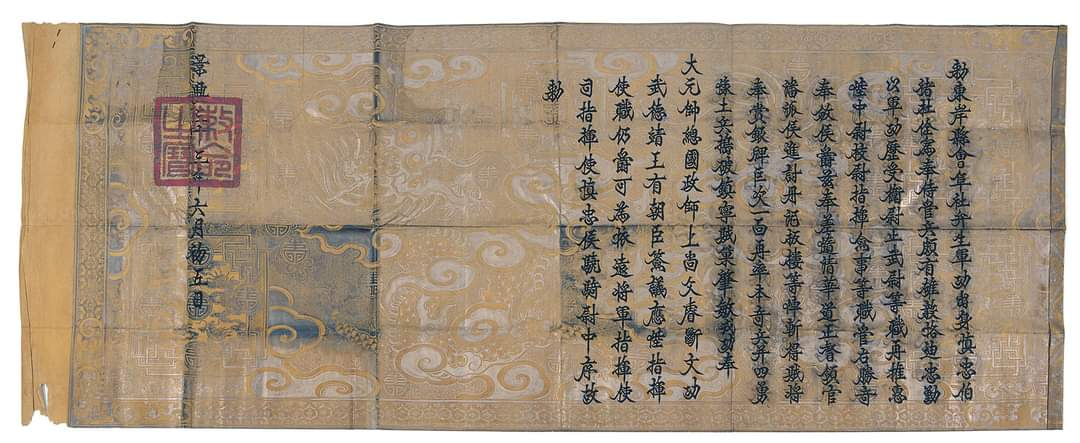
An edict during the reign of emperor Cảnh Hưng 景興.

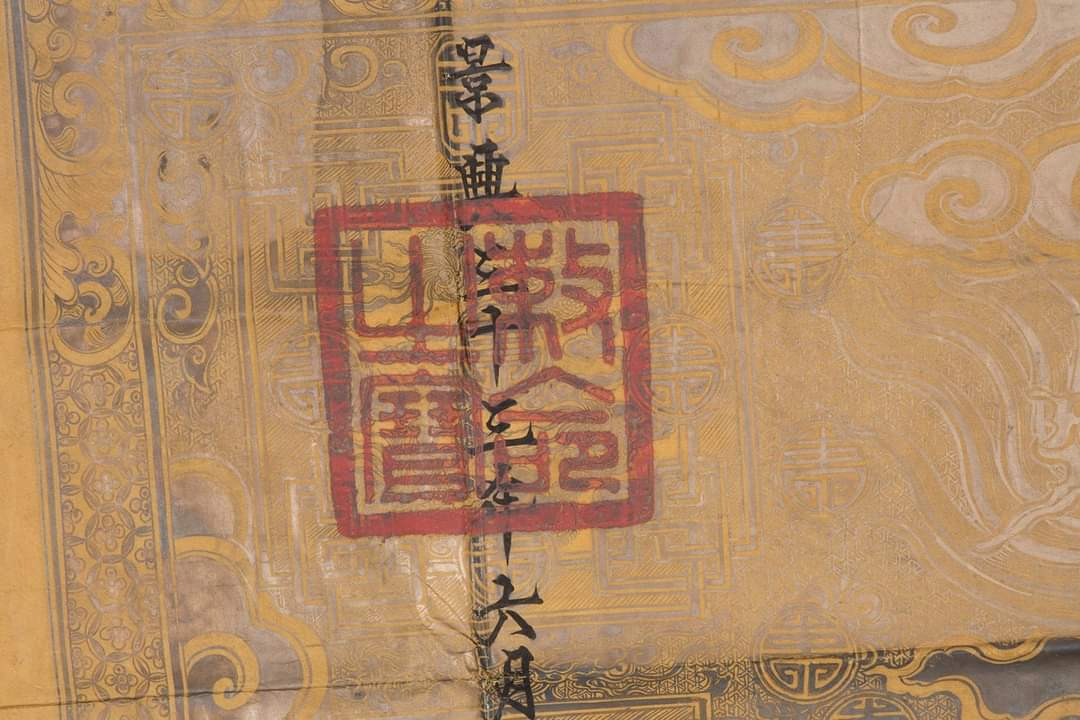
A closer up image of the Lệnh thư script.

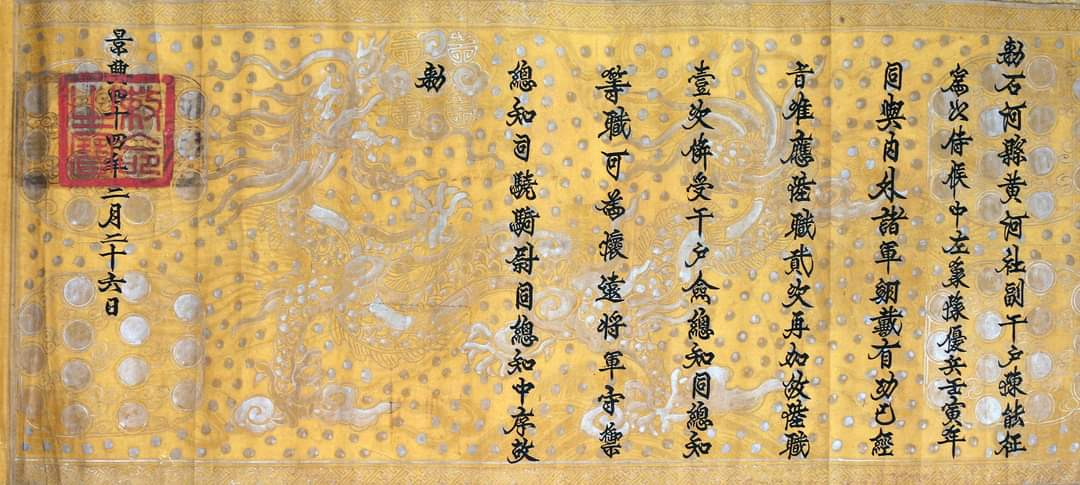
An edict during the reign of emperor Cảnh Hưng 景興.

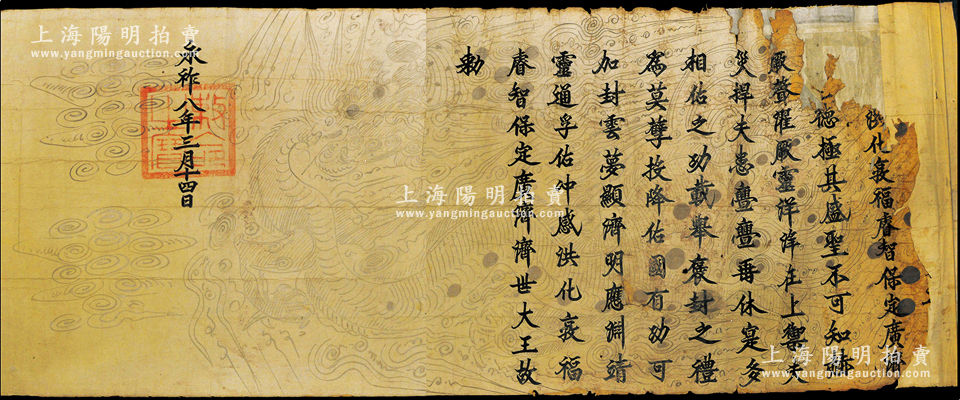
An edict during the reign of emperor Vĩnh Tộ 永祚.

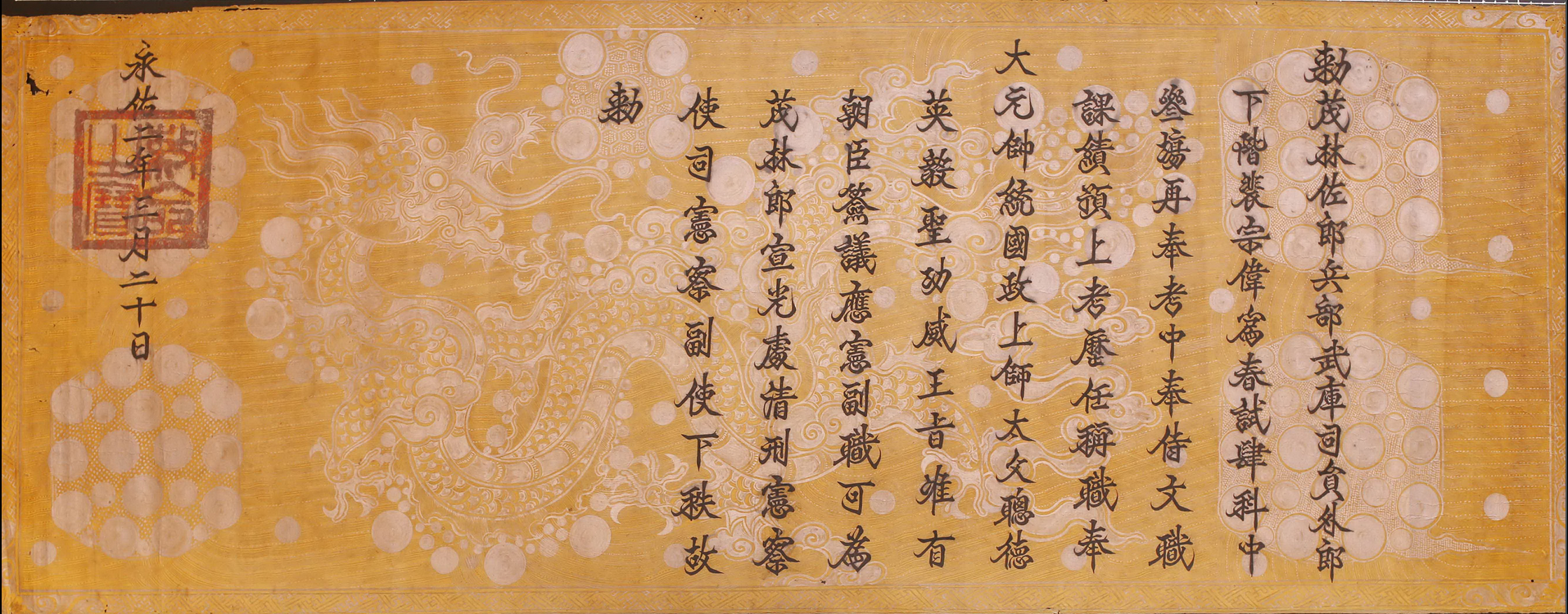
An edict during the reign of emperor Vĩnh Hựu 永佑.

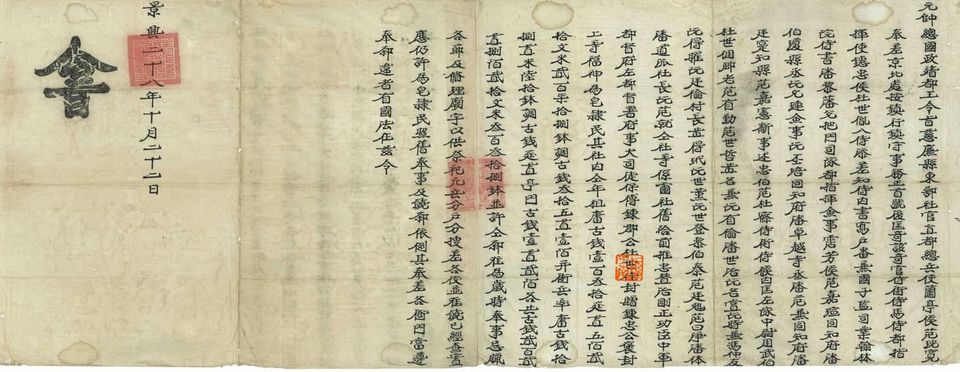
Trịnh Sâm 鄭森's letter to the Tây Sơn dynasty. Written in Lệnh thư script.

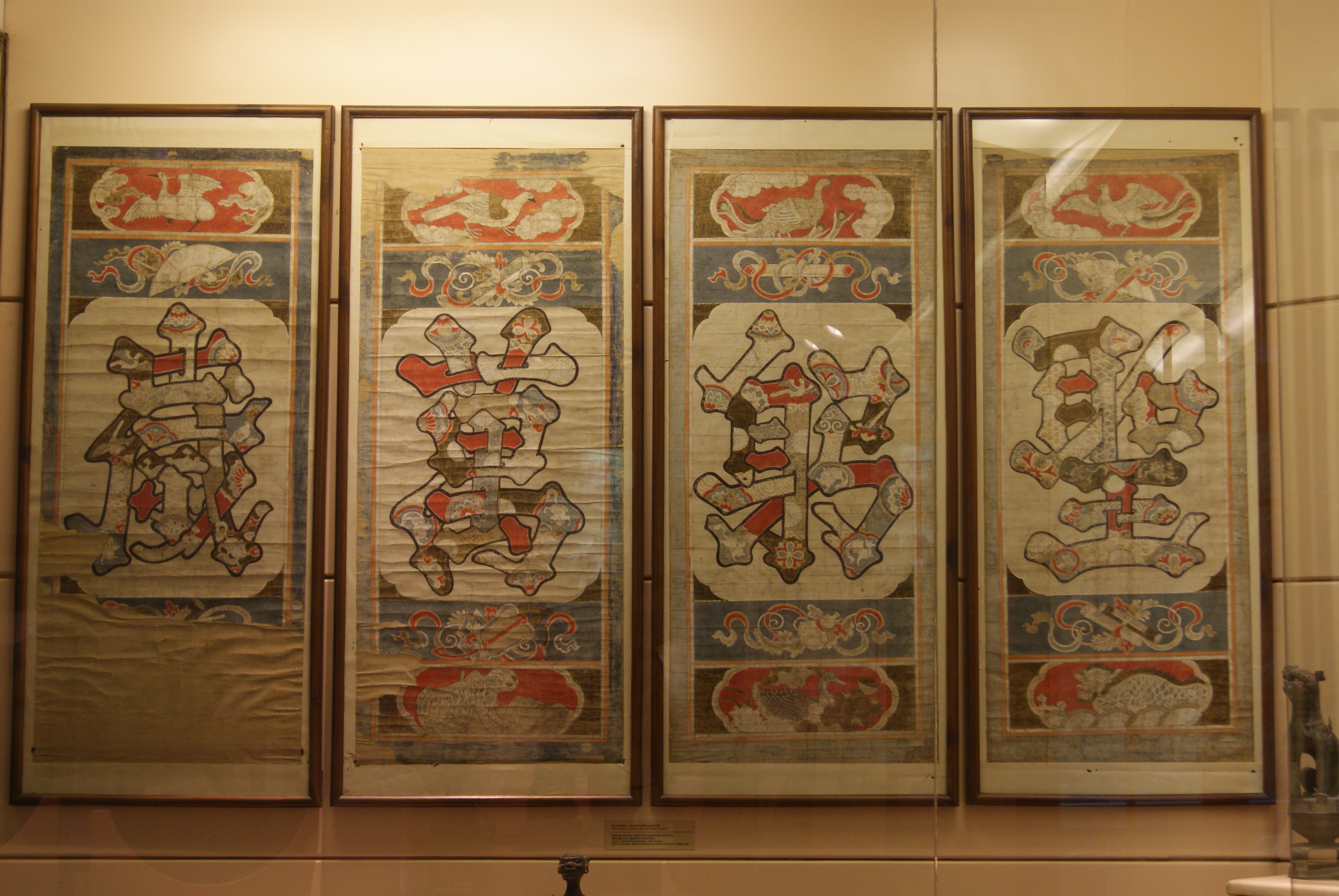
Wooden paintings with "聖躬萬歲" (Thánh cung vạn tuế; Long live the emperor!) written in Lệnh thư script. Dated around the 18th century

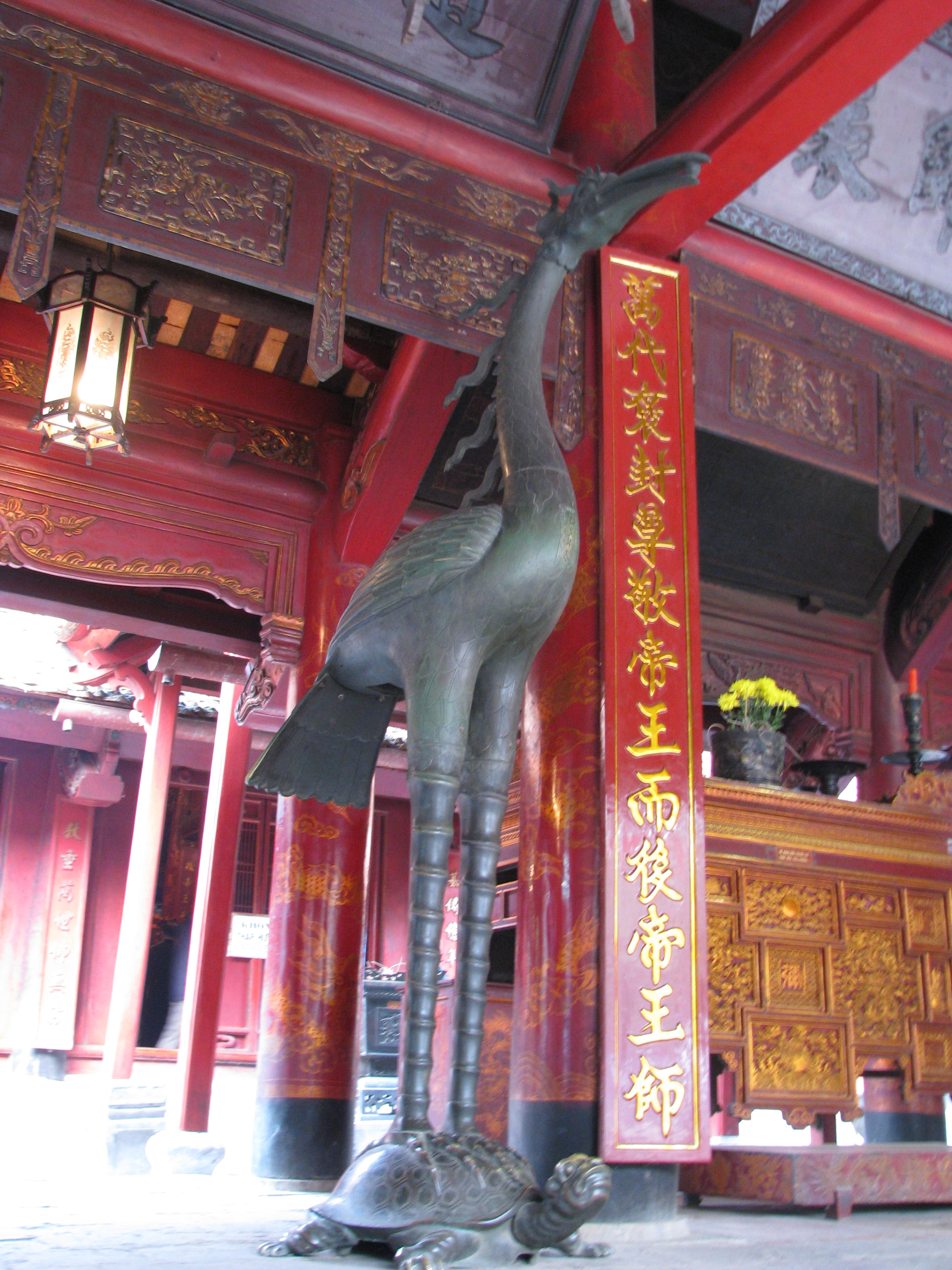
A placard in the Temple of Literature written in the Lệnh thư.

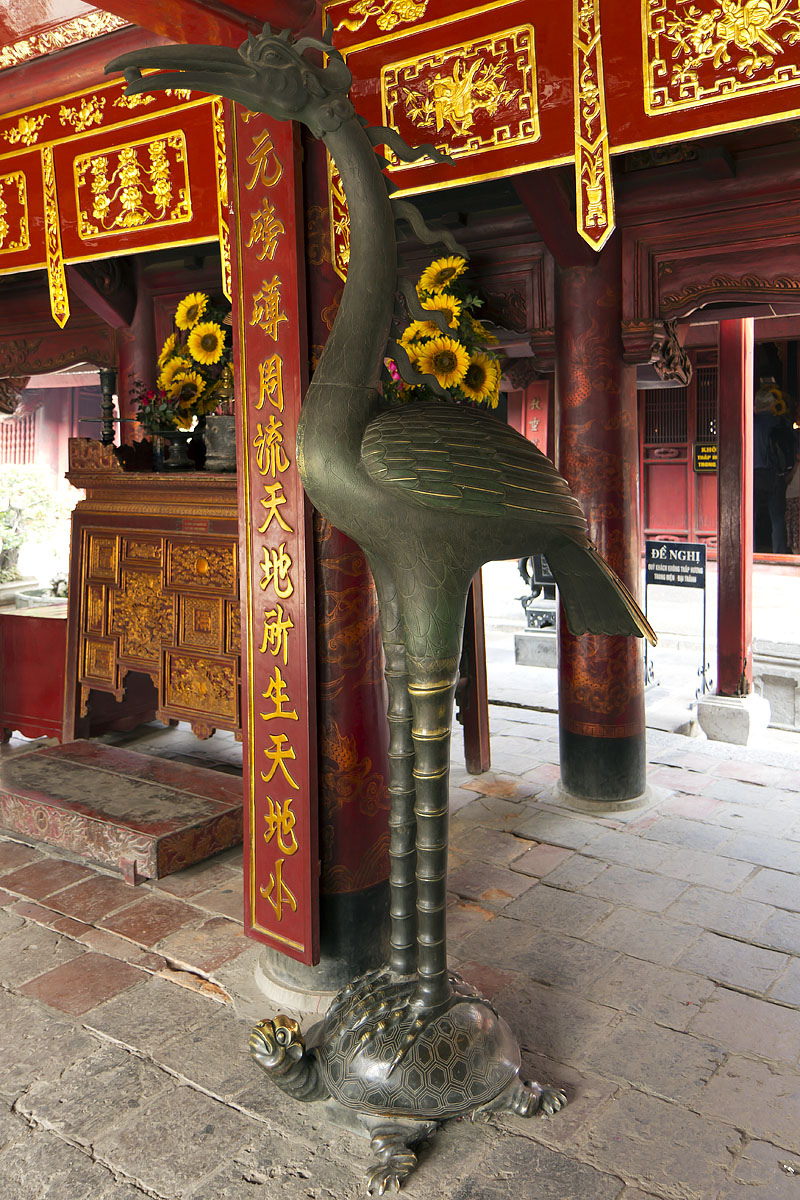
The other placard in the Temple of Literature written in the Lệnh thư.

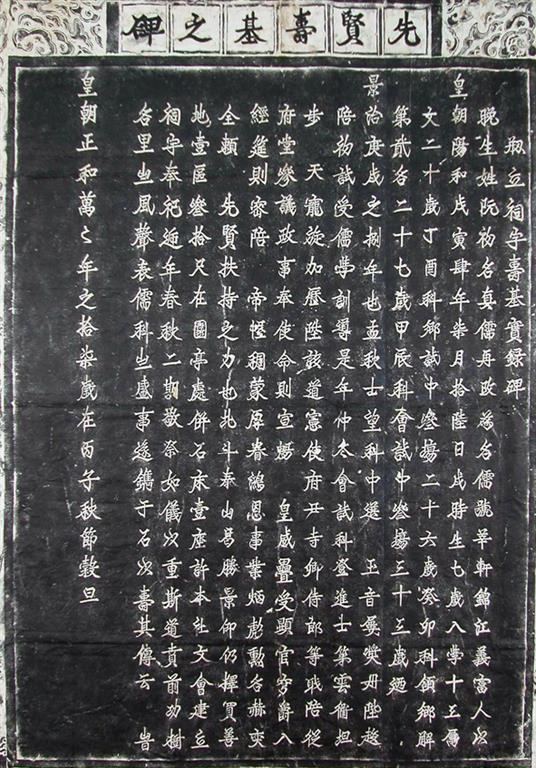
Stele of a poem written in Lệnh thư.

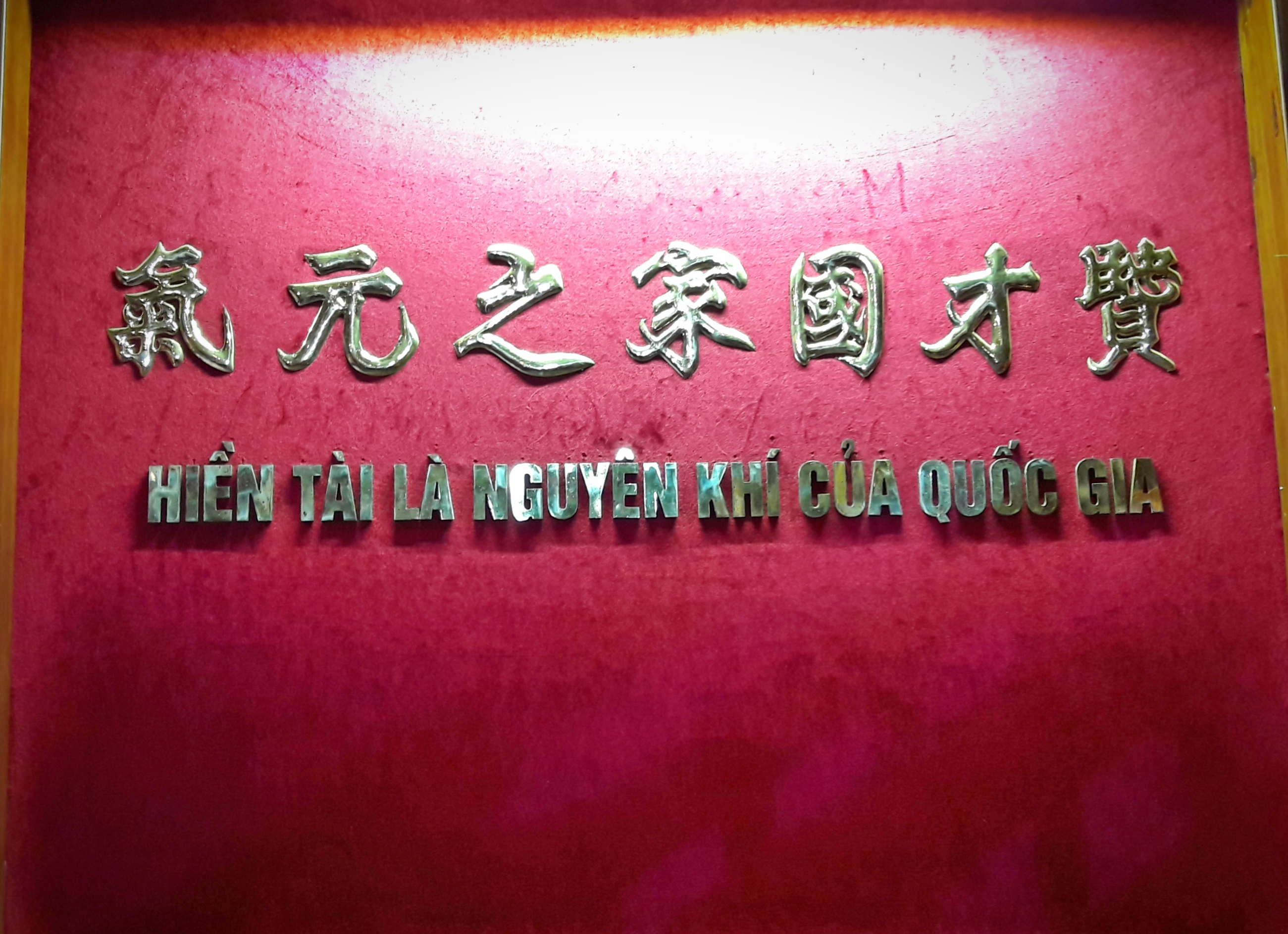
Quote by Thân Nhân Trung in Lệnh thư (賢才國家之元氣).

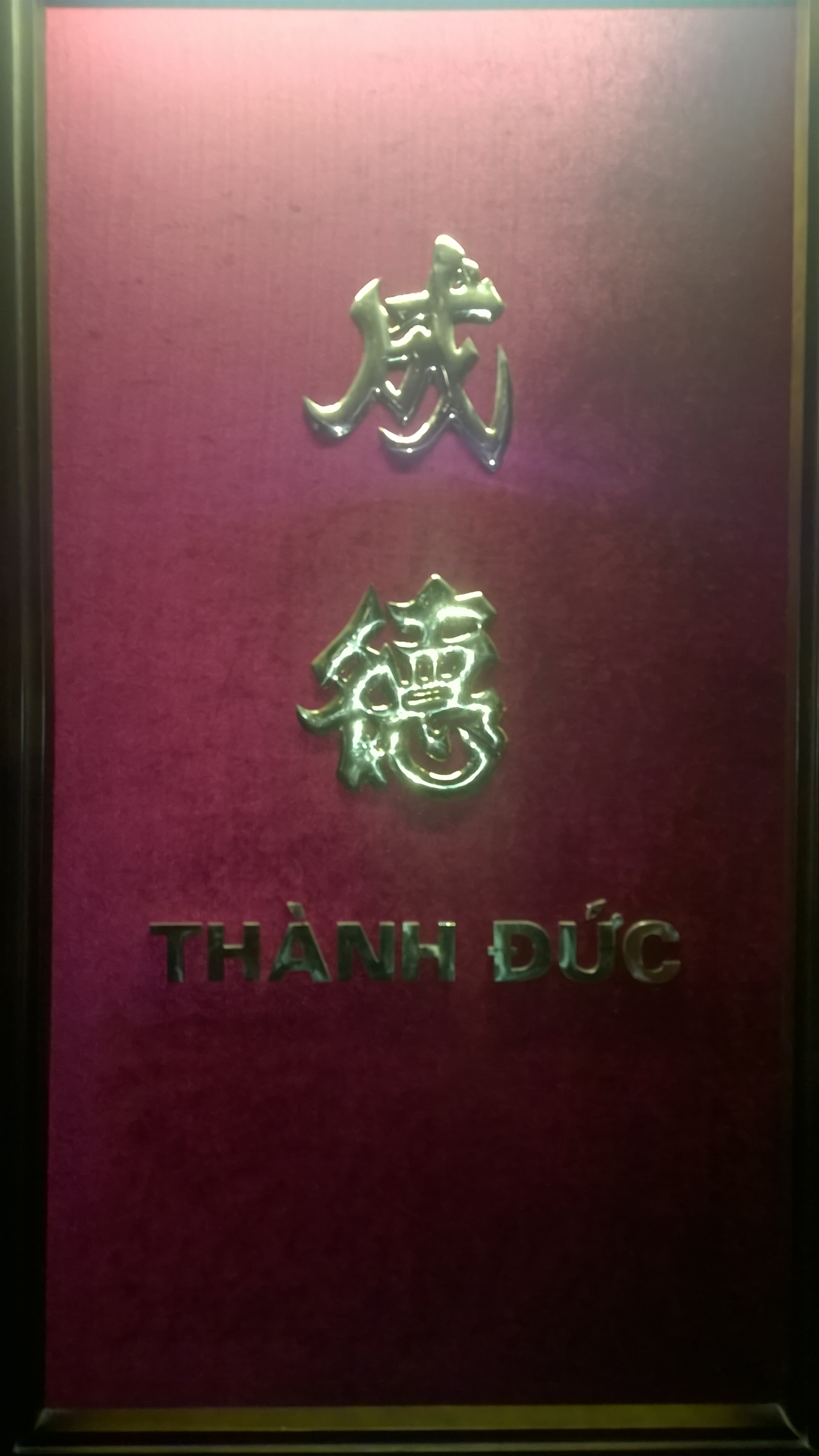
成徳 Thành Đức written in Lệnh thư

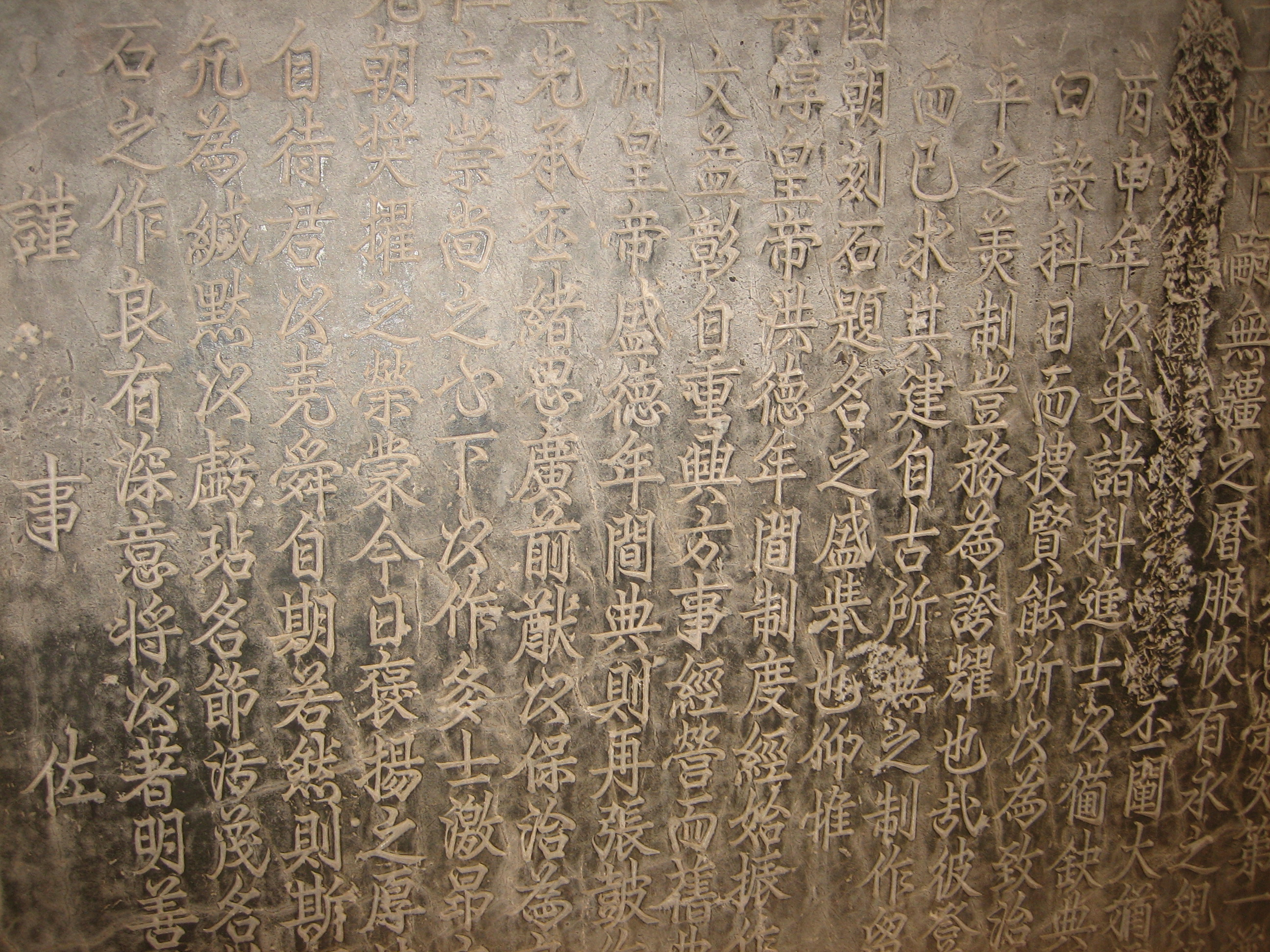
Characters on a stele.

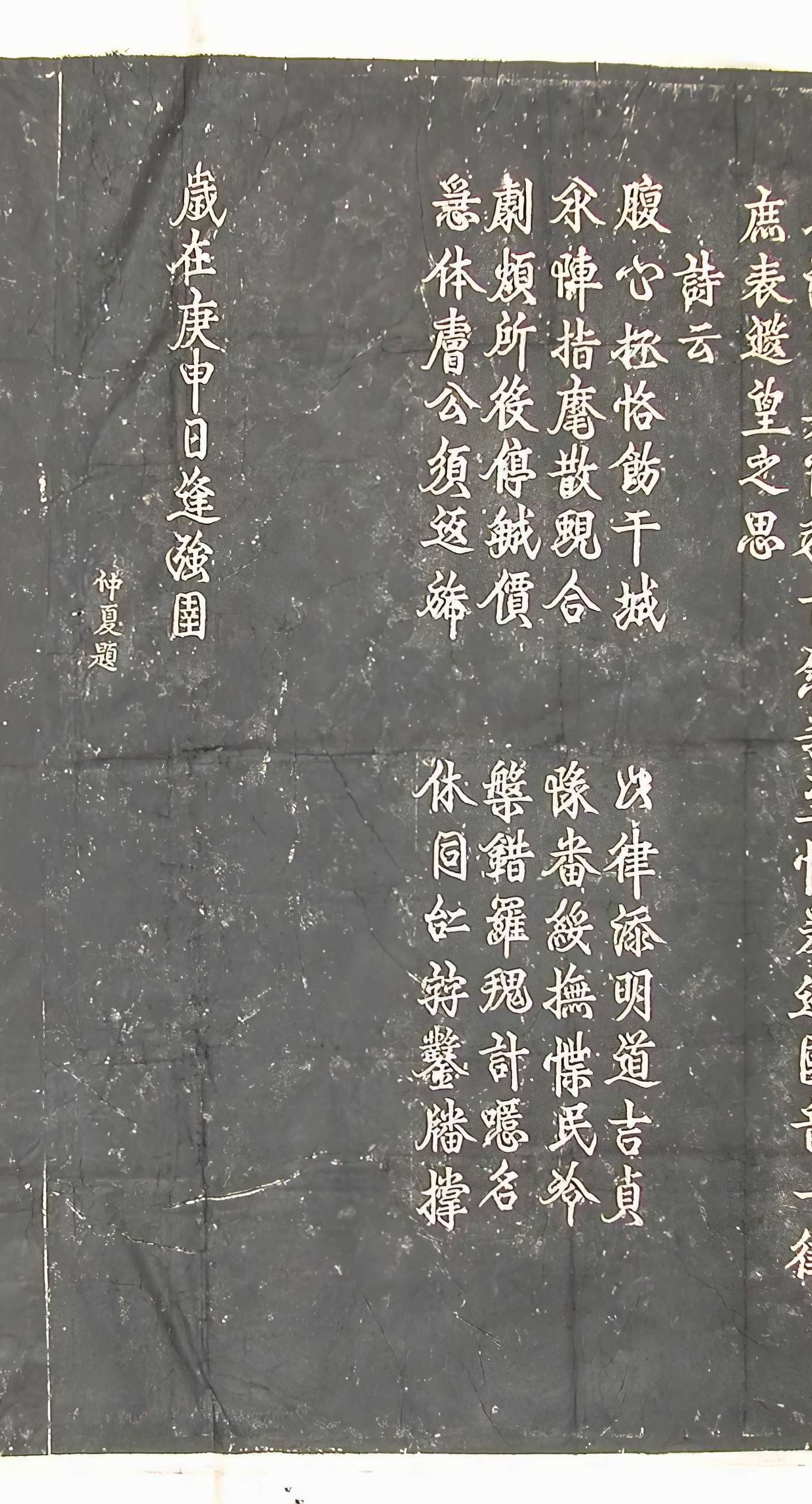
Nôm poem written by Lê Hiển Tông in 1740.

== See also ==
- Chữ Hán
- Chữ Nôm
- Vietnamese calligraphy
- Chinese calligraphy
