= Lê–Mạc War =

16th and 17th-century war in present-day Northern Vietnam

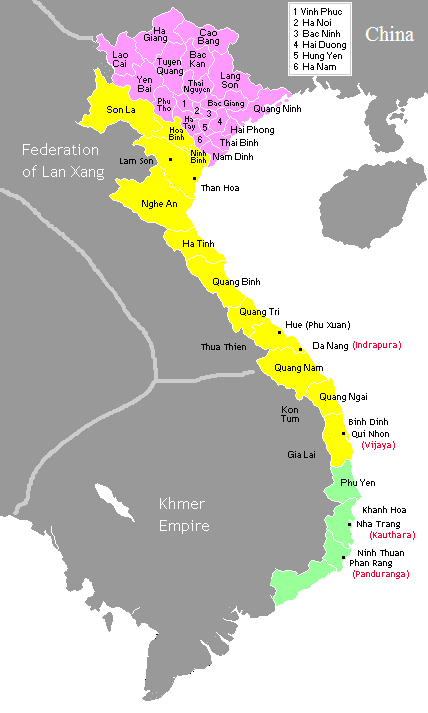
- Territorial control from 1555 to 1592: Mạc dynasty Lê dynasty under command of Trịnh clan and Nguyễn clan. Kingdom of Champa.
Date	1533–1593 (first phrase); 1593–1677 (second phrase)
Location	Northern Vietnam and North Central Coast area
Result	Revival Lê dynasty victory: Mạc dynasty retreated to Cao Bằng in 1592, and collapse in 1677.; Rise of the Trịnh clan and Nguyễn clan.

Belligerents
Mạc dynasty Bầu lords (from 1594); Political support: Ming dynasty	Revival Lê dynasty Bầu lords (1527–1593); Nguyễn lords (until 1600); Trịnh lords

Commanders and leaders
Mạc Thái Tổ; Mạc Thái Tông; Mạc Hiến Tông; Mạc Tuyên Tông; Mạc Mậu Hợp; Mạc Kính Điển; Nguyễn Kính; Phạm Tử Nghi; Dương Chấp Nhất; Lê Bá Ly (until 1551); Nguyễn Quyện; Mạc Đôn Nhượng; Mạc Ngọc Liễn; Lê Khắc Thận (before 1551, after 1572); Bùi Văn Khuê (before 1592, from 1600) Second phrase: Mạc Kính Chỉ; Mạc Kính Cung; Mạc Kính Khoan; Mạc Kính Vũ	Nguyễn Kim; Nguyễn Hoàng (until 1600); Trịnh Kiểm; Trịnh Tùng; Lại Thế Vinh; Lê Bá Ly (1551–1557); Hoàng Đình Ái; Nguyễn Hữu Liêu; Nguyễn Khải Khang (from 1551); Lê Khắc Thận (1551–1572); Vũ Sư Thước; Lại Thế Khanh; Bùi Văn Khuê (1592–1600) Second phrase: Trịnh Tráng; Trịnh Tạc; Lê Thì Hiến; Lê Sĩ Triệt; Đinh Văn Tả

Strength
Around 120,000	Around 60,000; 100,000+ (1677)

Casualties and losses
Unknown	Unknown

The Lê–Mạc War (Vietnamese: Chiến tranh Lê-Mạc; chữ Hán: 戰爭黎莫) was a civil war waged between two Vietnamese dynasties, the Mạc and Revival Lê, during the Southern and Northern Dynasties period of Vietnamese history.

The Vietnamese throne was usurped by Mạc Đăng Dung in 1527. Lê Ninh, a prince of the Later Lê dynasty, escaped to Lan Xang. In 1533, Lê Ninh proclaimed himself emperor with the support of Nguyễn Kim and Trịnh Kiểm. The civil war between the two dynasties thus ensued.

In 1592, Đông Kinh, the capital of the Mạc dynasty, was reconquered by the Later Lê forces, marking the end of the Southern and Northern Dynasties period. Mạc rulers fled to Cao Bằng Province, with the direct support of the Chinese Ming and Qing dynasties until they were completedly defeated by Trịnh clan in 1677.

== Background ==
Since 1428, state of Đại Việt was restored by the Lê dynasty (during the Later Lê dynasty) after the founder Lê Lợi, the leader of Lam Sơn uprising who drove out the Ming Chinese invaders. Soon after, the monarch adopted Neo-Confucianism and state-centralization as a national ideology. The fifth monarch, Emperor Lê Thánh Tông (Lê Hạo) had created the solid National Code based on Neo- Confucian beliefs, helping businesses and trading markets flourish, later successfully expanding Đại Việt's territories into the northern territory of Champa and Xiangkhoang Plateau (formerly known as Trấn Ninh ).

After Thánh Tông's death in 1497, Đại Việt started to decline gradually and fell into social unrest due to corruption and peasant rebellions. In 1515, Trần Cảo launched a rebellion against the court. In 1517, a massive typhoon struck Thái Bình and Hải Dương provinces, killing 21,000 civilians. Many agriculture fields and businesses began going down and the economy was stagnated. There were six successive monarchs after Lê Thánh Tông had lost control of the government and the army, causing the rise of military rulers and corruption. In 1522, a military general named Mạc Đăng Dung during his struggle against the Trịnh and Nguyễn clans, had gained the regent of the government by installing Prince Xuan as the new Emperor. On 18 June 1527, Mạc Đăng Dung executed Lê Cung Hoàng and established the new Mạc dynasty. The deposed Lê royal family were exiled in Lan Xang. In 1533, Lê loyalist general Nguyễn Kim brought prince Lê Duy Ninh back to throne with title emperor Lê Trang Tông and began to reconquer the southern part of the country. Lê army regained the provinces of Thanh Hóa and Nghệ An, set Tây Kinh in Thanh Hóa as the temporary capital and base for imperial court, and started the period Southern and Northern dynasties (Nam Bắc Triều) in Vietnam, which lasted until 1592.

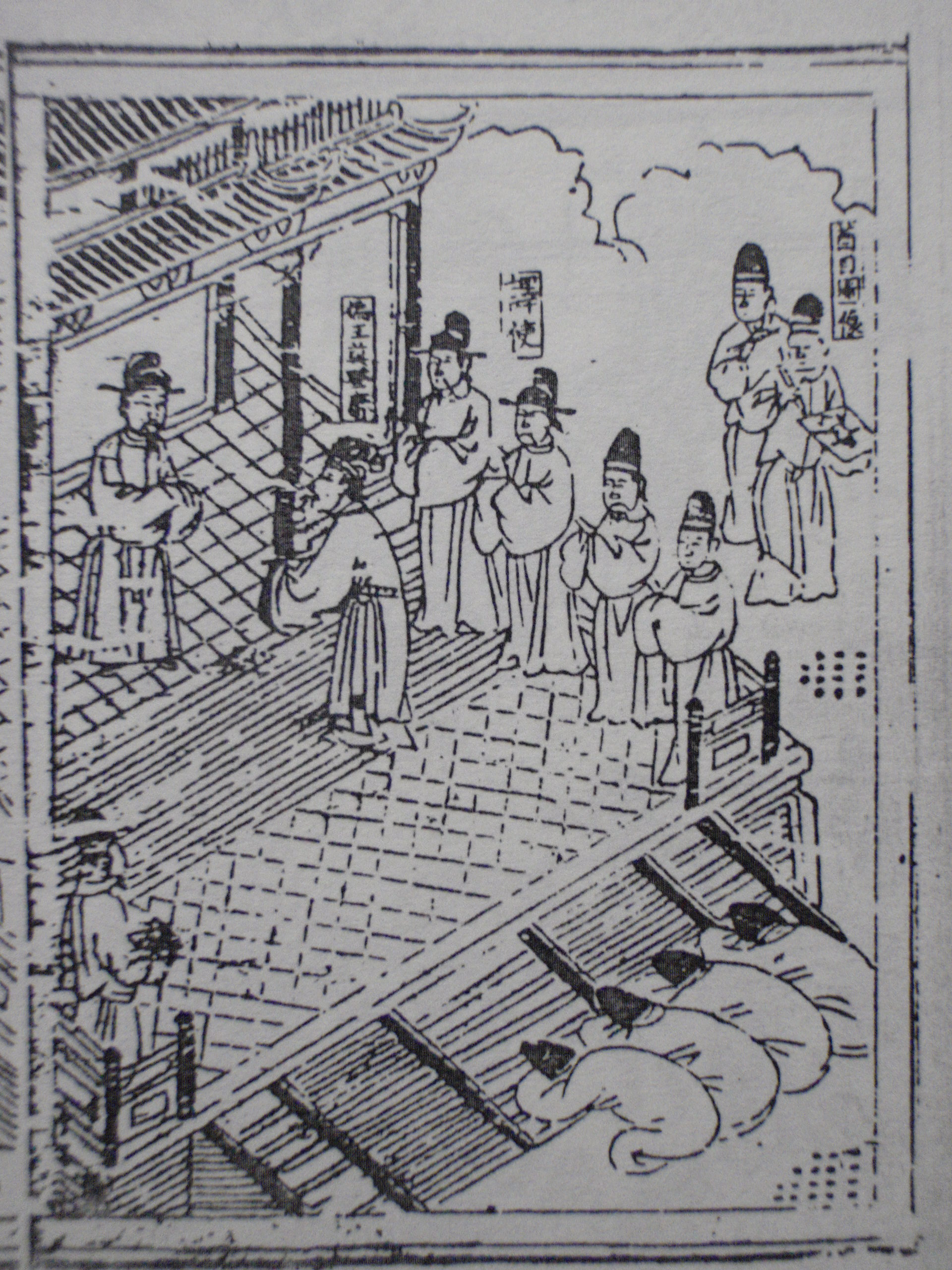
Mạc Đăng Dung [bowing in center] surrenders to Ming China army in Lạng Sơn, 1541.

In 1537, Lê Trang Tông sent delegations to Ming China, and sought Chinese military support and diplomatic recognition as legitimate government to reclaim the throne of Đại Việt. Jiajing Emperor of the Ming dynasty responded by sending 125,000 soldiers to the border, threatening the Mạc regime in Đông Kinh. At the final moment, Mạc Đăng Dung surrendered to the Ming dynasty at Nam Quan Pass in 1541, as he accepted his regime and monarch would be under Chinese protection and ceded half of Quảng Ninh province to China (now Fangcheng, Guangxi). While being under the political protection of Ming China, the Mạc dynasty rebuilt the agricultural economy, opened businesses and factories, and recovered an army of 120,000 soldiers.

The Mạc dynasty tolerated other religions and foreign trades, allowing Buddhism and Taoism to coexist, and Christians were free to spread and worship. Portuguese merchants and missionaries, who had been in Vietnam since 1524, brought Christianity and arquebus technology for Vietnam. The Southern Lê regime opened for the Western world, with trade ports appearing in the cities of Đà Nẵng and Hội An. The regime quickly adopted the matchlock technique in the army, but had less toleration for the new faith brought by missionaries. The Lê monarchs were under the control of military regents from powerful Trịnh and Nguyễn families. The two monarchs claimed their rule over Dai Viet, thus starting a series of conflicts.

== Conflicts ==
=== Conflicts in 1554–1555 ===
In 1554, Trịnh Kiểm, the military regent of the Lê dynasty, dispatched 25,000 men to the south and easily regained two provinces, Thuận Hóa and Quảng Nam from the Mạc. Trịnh Kiểm also restored Cham principalities in Ninh Thuận and Bình Thuận.

In August 1555, Prince Mạc Kính Điển of the Northern dynasty, led 100 warships in an attack on Thanh Hóa shores. When the Mạc fleet was advancing on Mã River, Lê forces under Trịnh Kiểm ambushed them with matchlock firearms and canoes led by general Nguyễn Khải Khang, a Mạc defector. Mạc Kính Điển survived and fled back to Hanoi.

=== Conflicts in 1557 ===
In July 1557, Mạc Kính Điển launched another naval offensive to the south. Lê warships once again ambushed the Mạc fleet on the Mã river. Mạc Kính Điểm jumped down the river and fled to the nearby forest. He and the Mạc remnants escaped back to the north after three days of hiding in a cave. With the winning triumph, the Lê army pursued the Mạc army to Sơn Nam (Nam Định province). Mạc Kính Điển returned to his position and defeated the Southern army.

=== Conflicts in 1559–1562 ===
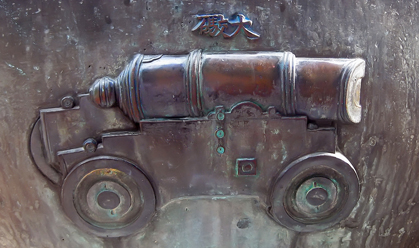
Carved wood in Hue, showing the cannons that were used by the Lê and Mạc forces

In September 1559, Trịnh Kiểm ordered a new northward offensive, and dispatched 60,000 soldiers and elephants, armed with Portuguese-style matchlocks. By January 1560, the Lê-Trịnh army had occupied all cities and territories beyond south of the Red River, leaving Mạc capital Đông Kinh under siege. Mạc emperor Quang Bảo evacuated his government to Quảng Ninh province, near China, while reinforcing 50,000 men to defend Hanoi and Hải Dương. After fighting for a year, the Lê-Trịnh army was still unable to capture Hanoi and Hải Dương. In March 1561, Mạc Kính Điển launched a surprise naval attack in Thanh Hóa and Nghệ An, forcing the Lê-Trịnh army to retreat back to Thanh Hóa to avoid Mạc's encirclement. Finally, the two sides grew very tired and withdrew their forces back to their original territories.

=== Conflicts in 1570–1579 ===
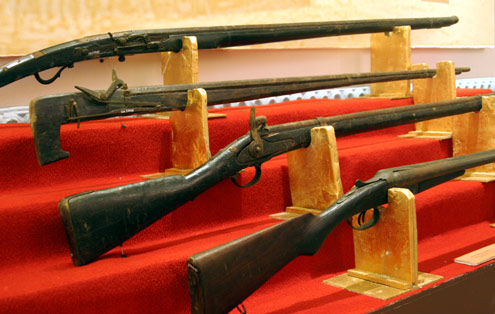
Matchlock rifles used during 16th-18th century in Vietnam, National Museum of Vietnamese History, Hanoi.

In 1570, Trịnh Kiểm died and his son Trịnh Cối succeeded the military ruler of the Southern army. In August 1570, Mạc Kính Điển launched a large southward offensive, dispatched 100,000 men and 700 ships, and attacked the Southern court through Laos and sea. Trịnh Cối surrendered to the Mạc. Southern Emperor Lê Chính Trị transferred the Military Commander to Trịnh Tùng while evacuating his government to the south. While occupying and looting Tây Kinh, the Mac army committed atrocities against civilians and destroyed architecture. In 1571, Mạc forces advanced further south to Cả River. In October 1572, Mạc forces retreated back to the north.

From 1573 to 1576, the Northern dynasty launched 4 southward offensives and raids, causing devastation for the Southern dynasty. The Lê-Trịnh army then recruited Cham people to fight against the Mạc.

In September 1577, Mạc Kính Điển saw the opportunity to annihilate the Southern dynasty, and reunify the country. Mạc Kính Điển and his general Lại Thế Mỹ led 40,000 men to attack the Southern court in Thanh Hóa, but were defeated by Lê-Trịnh forces in Khoái Lạc. Thế Mỹ was shot and killed while mounted on horseback.

From August 1578 to November 1579, Northern Mạc forces made three more raids into Southern dynasty territories, but all were repelled with outgunned Lê-Trịnh matchlocks.

=== Conflicts in 1580–1583 ===
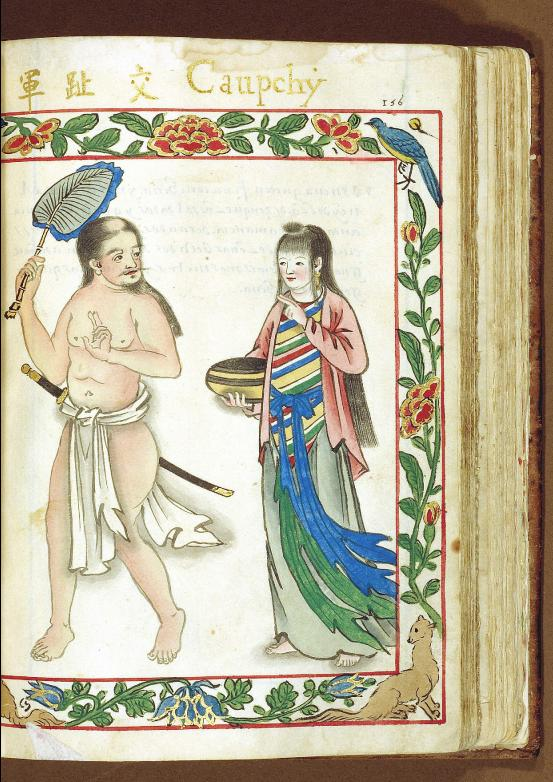
Wokou mercenary and his wife in Hải Phòng, Vietnam in 1590. From manuscript Boxer Codex

From 1580 to 1583, Lê-Trịnh and Mạc forces engaged in small to moderate-size conflicts along the Mã River. In November 1580, Mạc Kính Điển died and his brother, prince Mạc Đôn Nhượng succeed the military ruler of the Northern dynasty. The Mạc regime began declining and these were the last of the Northern dynasty's southward offensives.

=== Conflicts in 1584–1589 ===
In 1584, the new Northern emperor Mạc Mậu Hợp succeed the throne when he was a child. The monarchy and the government had become more unstable. Military lord Trịnh Tùng commanded the Southern army, which launched five raids into Northern dynasty territories, causing severe damage to the economy and weakening the Mạc regime. Trịnh Tùng also hired the Wokou pirates as mercenaries, raiding the coastal area and port cities in Northern territories.

=== The last stand of Northern dynasty (1592–1593) ===
In February 1592, the Southern dynasty launched a large northward offensive against the Northern Mạc. Trịnh Tùng and his general Nguyễn Hữu Liêu, Trịnh Ninh, Hoàng Đình Ái, Trịnh Đồng, Trịnh Đỗ, Hà Thọ Lộc and Ngô Cảnh Hựu commanded 60,000 troops, captured towns and cities beyond south of the Red river. Mạc Mậu Hợp sent all of his troops to resist the Southern army, but was defeated.

On 14 November 1592, Lê-Trịnh army captured three western province Lào Cai, Yên Bái and Phú Thọ. On 25 November, Trịnh Tùng's forces arrived Hải Dương, where they arrested and executed Mạc Mậu Hợp and his son Mạc Toàn. The Mạc remnants fled to the mountainous Bắc Cạn, Cao Bằng provinces, where they remained active. In April 1593, the southern emperor Lê Thế Tông was welcomed back to Đông Kinh (Hanoi).

== Aftermath ==
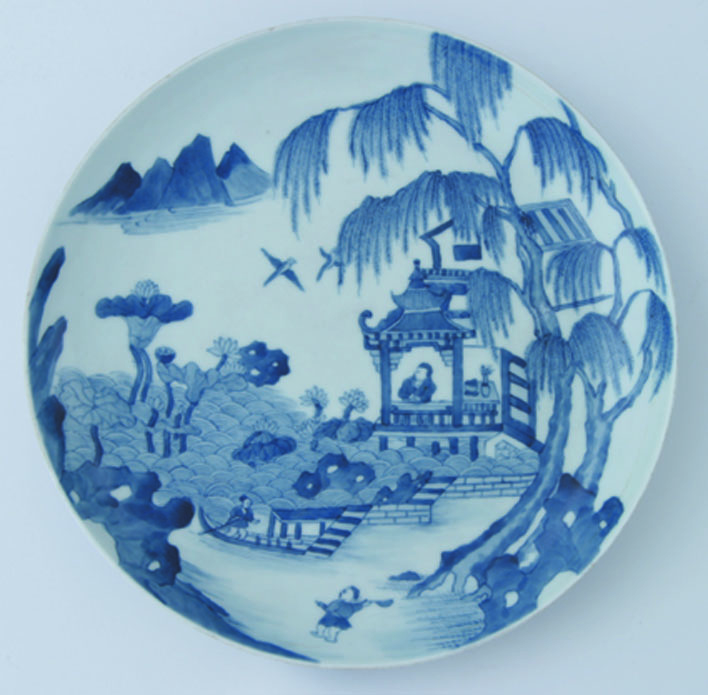
Chu Đậu's blue and white ceramic dish, 15th-16th century

The Lê monarch, after 59 years of war with rival Mạc, returned to the throne of Đại Việt. However, the Ming dynasty of China still only recognized the Mạc regime in Cao Bằng as the rightful ruler of Dai Viet. In 1597 Lê Thế Tông sent emissary Phùng Khắc Khoan to Beijing for renewing relations with China, who supports the Mạc dynasty. At the result, the Chinese Ming dynasty recognized both Lê and Mạc as the legitimate rulers of Vietnam, and in 1644 they officially re-recognized the Lê monarch as "king of sovereign Vietnam".

The remnant Mạc monarch in Cao Bằng province recruited Tai-speaking mountain tribes into their army. They also brought the Vietnamese Nôm script adoption to Tày people, called the Nôm Tày script. Mạc regime and the Vũ Văn clan's "chúa Bầu" in Hà Giang province remained in a state of rivalry with the Lê-Trịnh regime until they were annexed and exiled to China in 1677.

The Trịnh military lords of the Lê Dynasty, which was centered in Đông Kinh (Tonkin or Hanoi), soon doubted the loyalty of the Nguyễn governor in central and southern Vietnam. Over the next 30 years of unification and temporary peace, Vietnam once again would be divided by two military lords for another 150 years–fought against each other in the indecisive Trịnh–Nguyễn War. These long civil wars had devastated the Vietnamese nation, both its structure and economy, causing great dissatisfaction among the ordinary class and working class with the monarchs and the aristocrats, which ultimately culminated in the Tây Sơn rebellion in the late 18th century. The Chu Đậu ceramic factory in Chu Đậu village, Hải Dương province, which famously exported Vietnamese blue-white ceramics to Japan and West Asia from 13th to 17th century, was destroyed.

== See also ==
- Southern and Northern Dynasties (Vietnam)
- Trịnh–Nguyễn War

== Citations ==
- Kathlene Baldanza (2016). Ming China and Vietnam. Pennsylvania: Cambridge University Press. ISBN 9781107124240.
- John W. Dardess (2012). Ming China, 1368-1644: A Concise History of a Resilient Empire. Rowman & Littlefield. pp. 5–. ISBN 978-1-4422-0490-4.
- Tran Trong Kim (2005). Việt Nam sử lược (A Brief History of Vietnam) (in Vietnamese). Ho Chi Minh City: Ho Chi Minh City General Publishing House. pp. 260–273.
- Chapuis, Oscar (1995). A History of Vietnam: From Hong Bang to Tu Duc. Greenwood Publishing Group. pp. 113–119. ISBN 0-313-29622-7.
- Taylor, K. W. (2013). A History of the Vietnamese. Cambridge University Press. ISBN 978-0521875868.
