= Vietnamese era name =

Names that identify years in the Vietnamese era calendar

- Vietnamese alphabet: niên hiệu
- Chữ Hán: 年號

Vietnamese era names were titles adopted in historical Vietnam for the purpose of year identification and numbering.

Era names originated in 140 BCE in China, during the reign of the Emperor Wu of Han. Since the middle of the 6th century CE, independent Vietnamese dynasties started to proclaim their own era names.

During periods of direct Chinese rule, Chinese era names would gain official use in Vietnam, as was the case for other parts of China.

== List of Vietnamese era names ==
The following is a list of era names adopted by independent Vietnamese monarchs. Era names used in Vietnam during the four periods of direct Chinese rule are not included.

=== Early Lý dynasty ===
Era name	Period of use	Length of use	Remark
Lý Bôn 李賁 (r. 544–548 CE)
Thiên Đức 天德	544–548 CE	5 years	Or Đại Đức (大德).

=== Đinh dynasty ===
Era name	Period of use	Length of use	Remark
Đinh Bộ Lĩnh 丁部領 (r. 968–979 CE)
Thái Bình 太平	970–980 CE	11 years	Usage continued by Đinh Toàn upon his ascension to the throne.

=== Early Lê dynasty ===
Era name	Period of use	Length of use	Remark
Lê Hoàn 黎桓 (r. 980–1005 CE)
Thiên Phúc 天福	980–988 CE	9 years	Usage might be from 981 CE to 988 CE, for a total length of 8 years.
Hưng Thống 興統	989–993 CE	5 years	
Ứng Thiên 應天	994–1007 CE	14 years	Usage continued by Lê Trung Tông and Lê Ngọa Triều Đế upon their ascension to the throne.
Lê Ngọa Triều Đế 黎臥朝帝 (r. 1005–1009 CE)
Cảnh Thụy 景瑞	1008–1009 CE	2 years	Usage continued by Lý Thái Tổ upon his ascension to the throne.

=== Lý dynasty ===
Era name	Period of use	Length of use	Remark
Lý Thái Tổ 李太祖 (r. 1009–1028 CE)
Thuận Thiên 順天	1010–1028 CE	19 years	
Lý Thái Tông 李太宗 (r. 1028–1054 CE)
Thiên Thành 天成	1028–1034 CE	7 years	
Thông Thụy 通瑞	1034–1039 CE	6 years	
Càn Phù Hữu Đạo 乾符有道	1039–1042 CE	4 years	
Minh Đạo 明道	1042–1044 CE	3 years	
Thiên Cảm Thánh Vũ 天感聖武	1044–1049 CE	6 years	
Sùng Hưng Đại Bảo 崇興大寶	1049–1054 CE	6 years	
Lý Thánh Tông 李聖宗 (r. 1054–1072 CE)
Long Thụy Thái Bình 龍瑞太平	1054–1058 CE	5 years	
Chương Thánh Gia Khánh 彰聖嘉慶	1059–1065 CE	7 years	
Long Chương Thiên Tự 龍彰天嗣	1066–1068 CE	3 years	
Thiên Huống Bảo Tượng 天貺寶象	1068–1069 CE	2 years	
Thần Vũ 神武	1069–1072 CE	4 years	
Lý Nhân Tông 李仁宗 (r. 1072–1128 CE)
Thái Ninh 太寧	1072–1076 CE	5 years	
Anh Vũ Chiêu Thắng 英武昭勝	1076–1085 CE	10 years	
Quảng Hựu 廣祐	1085–1092 CE	8 years	
Hội Phong 會豐	1092–1100 CE	9 years	
Long Phù 龍符	1101–1109 CE	9 years	Or Long Phù Nguyên Hoá (龍符元化).
Hội Tường Đại Khánh 會祥大慶	1110–1119 CE	10 years	
Thiên Phù Duệ Vũ 天符睿武	1120–1126 CE	7 years	
Thiên Phù Khánh Thọ 天符慶壽	1127 CE	1 year	Usage continued by Lý Thần Tông upon his ascension to the throne.
Lý Thần Tông 李神宗 (r. 1127–1138 CE)
Thiên Thuận 天順	1128–1132 CE	5 years	Or Đại Thuận (大順).
Thiên Chương Bảo Tự 天彰寶嗣	1133–1138 CE	6 years	
Lý Anh Tông 李英宗 (r. 1138–1175 CE)
Thiệu Minh 紹明	1138–1140 CE	3 years	
Đại Định 大定	1140–1162 CE	23 years	
Chính Long Bảo Ứng 政隆寶應	1163–1174 CE	12 years	
Thiên Cảm Chí Bảo 天感至寶	1174–1175 CE	2 years	Usage continued by Lý Cao Tông upon his ascension to the throne.
Lý Cao Tông 李高宗 (r. 1175–1210 CE)
Trinh Phù 貞符	1176–1186 CE	11 years	
Thiên Tư Gia Thụy 天資嘉瑞	1186–1202 CE	17 years	
Thiên Gia Bảo Hựu 天嘉寶祐	1202–1205 CE	4 years	Or Thiên Tư Bảo Hựu (天資寶祐).
Trị Bình Long Ứng 治平龍應	1205–1210 CE	6 years	Usage continued by Lý Huệ Tông upon his ascension to the throne.
Lý Huệ Tông 李惠宗 (r. 1210–1224 CE)
Kiến Gia 建嘉	1211–1224 CE	14 years	
Lý Nguyên Hoàng 李元皇 (r. 1214–1216 CE)
Càn Ninh 乾寧	1214–1216 CE	3 years	
Lý Chiêu Hoàng 李昭皇 (r. 1224–1225 CE)
Thiên Chương Hữu Đạo 天彰有道	1224–1225 CE	2 years	

=== Trần dynasty ===
Era name	Period of use	Length of use	Remark
Trần Thái Tông 陳太宗 (r. 1225–1258 CE)
Kiến Trung 建中	1225–1232 CE	8 years	
Thiên Ứng Chính Bình 天應政平	1232–1251 CE	20 years	
Nguyên Phong 元豐	1251–1258 CE	8 years	
Trần Thánh Tông 陳聖宗 (r. 1258–1278 CE)
Thiệu Long 紹隆	1258–1272 CE	15 years	
Bảo Phù 寶符	1273–1278 CE	6 years	Usage continued by Trần Nhân Tông upon his ascension to the throne.
Trần Nhân Tông 陳仁宗 (r. 1278–1293 CE)
Thiệu Bảo 紹寶	1279–1285 CE	7 years	
Trùng Hưng 重興	1285–1293 CE	9 years	
Trần Anh Tông 陳英宗 (r. 1293–1314 CE)
Hưng Long 興隆	1293–1314 CE	22 years	
Trần Minh Tông 陳明宗 (r. 1314–1329 CE)
Đại Khánh 大慶	1314–1323 CE	10 years	
Khai Thái 開泰	1324–1329 CE	6 years	
Trần Hiến Tông 陳憲宗 (r. 1329–1341 CE)
Khai Hựu 開祐	1329–1341 CE	13 years	
Trần Dụ Tông 陳裕宗 (r. 1341–1369 CE)
Thiệu Phong 紹豐	1341–1357 CE	17 years	
Đại Trị 大治	1358–1369 CE	12 years	
Dương Nhật Lễ 楊日禮 (r. 1369–1370 CE)
Đại Định 大定	1369–1370 CE	2 years	
Trần Nghệ Tông 陳藝宗 (r. 1370–1372 CE)
Thiệu Khánh 紹慶	1370–1372 CE	3 years	Usage continued by Trần Duệ Tông upon his ascension to the throne.
Trần Duệ Tông 陳睿宗 (r. 1372–1377 CE)
Long Khánh 隆慶	1373–1377 CE	5 years	
Trần Hiện 陳晛 (r. 1377–1388 CE)
Xương Phù 昌符	1377–1388 CE	12 years	
Trần Thuận Tông 陳順宗 (r. 1388–1398 CE)
Quang Thái 光泰	1388–1398 CE	11 years	
Trần An 陳𭴣 (r. 1398–1400 CE)
Kiến Tân 建新	1398–1400 CE	3 years	

==== Other regimes contemporaneous with Trần dynasty ====
Era name	Period of use	Length of use	Remark
Nguyễn Bổ 阮補 (r. 1379 CE)
Hy Nguyên 熙元	1379 CE	1 year	

=== Hồ dynasty ===
Era name	Period of use	Length of use	Remark
Hồ Quý Ly 胡季犛 (r. 1400 CE)
Thánh Nguyên 聖元	1400 CE	1 year	Or Nguyên Thánh (元聖). Usage continued by Hồ Hán Thương upon his ascension to the throne.
Hồ Hán Thương 胡漢蒼 (r. 1400–1407 CE)
Thiệu Thành 紹成	1401–1402 CE	2 years	
Khai Đại 開大	1403–1407 CE	5 years	

=== Later Trần dynasty ===
Era name	Period of use	Length of use	Remark
Giản Định Đế 簡定帝 (r. 1407–1409 CE)
Hưng Khánh 興慶	1407–1409 CE	3 years	
Trùng Quang Đế 重光帝 (r. 1409–1413 CE)
Trùng Quang 重光	1409–1413 CE	5 years	
Trần Cảo 陳暠 (r. 1426–1428 CE)
Thiên Khánh 天慶	1426–1428 CE	3 years	

==== Other regimes contemporaneous with Later Trần dynasty ====
Era name	Period of use	Length of use	Remark
Phạm Ngọc 范玉 (r. 1417–1420 CE)
Vĩnh Ninh 永寧	1417–1420 CE	4 years	
Lê Ngã 黎餓 (r. 1420 CE)
Vĩnh Thiên 永天	1420 CE	1 month	

=== Primitive Lê dynasty ===
Era name	Period of use	Length of use	Remark
Lê Thái Tổ 黎太祖 (r. 1428–1433 CE)
Thuận Thiên 順天	1428–1433 CE	6 years	Usage continued by Lê Thái Tông upon his ascension to the throne.
Lê Thái Tông 黎太宗 (r. 1433–1442 CE)
Thiệu Bình 紹平	1434–1439 CE	6 years	
Đại Bảo 大寶	1440–1442 CE	3 years	Or Thái Bảo (太寶). Usage continued by Lê Nhân Tông upon his ascension to the throne.
Lê Nhân Tông 黎仁宗 (r. 1442–1459 CE)
Đại Hòa 大和	1443–1453 CE	11 years	Or Thái Hòa (太和).
Diên Ninh 延寧	1454–1459 CE	6 years	
Lê Nghi Dân 黎宜民 (r. 1459–1460 CE)
Thiên Hưng 天興	1459–1460 CE	2 years	
Lê Thánh Tông 黎聖宗 (r. 1460–1497 CE)
Quang Thuận 光順	1460–1469 CE	10 years	
Hồng Đức 洪德	1470–1497 CE	28 years	Usage continued by Lê Hiến Tông upon his ascension to the throne.
Lê Hiến Tông 黎憲宗 (r. 1497–1504 CE)
Cảnh Thống 景統	1498–1504 CE	7 years	
Lê Túc Tông 黎肅宗 (r. 1504 CE)
Thái Trinh 太貞	1504 CE	1 year	Usage continued by Lê Uy Mục Đế upon his ascension to the throne.
Lê Uy Mục Đế 黎威穆帝 (r. 1504–1509 CE)
Đoan Khánh 端慶	1505–1509 CE	5 years	
Lê Tương Dực Đế 黎襄翼帝 (r. 1509–1516 CE)
Hồng Thuận 洪順	1509–1516 CE	8 years	
Lê Chiêu Tông 黎昭宗 (r. 1516–1522 CE)
Quang Thiệu 光紹	1516–1522 CE	7 years	
Lê Cung Hoàng 黎恭皇 (r. 1522–1527 CE)
Thống Nguyên 統元	1522–1527 CE	6 years	

==== Other regimes contemporaneous with Primitive Lê dynasty ====
Era name	Period of use	Length of use	Remark
Trần Cao 陳暠 (r. 1516 CE)
Thiên Ứng 天應	1516 CE	8 months	Or Ứng Thiên (應天).
Trần Cung 陳㫒 (r. 1516–1521 CE)
Tuyên Hòa 宣和	1516–1521 CE	6 years	
Lê Bảng 黎榜 (r. 1518–1519 CE)
Đại Đức 大德	1518–1519 CE	2 years	Or Thiên Đức (天德).
Lê Do 黎槱 (r. 1519 CE)
Thiên Hiến 天憲	1519 CE	1 year	

=== Mạc dynasty ===
Era name	Period of use	Length of use	Remark
Mạc Thái Tổ 莫太祖 (r. 1527–1529 CE)
Minh Đức 明德	1527–1529 CE	3 years	
Mạc Thái Tông 莫太宗 (r. 1529–1540 CE)
Đại Chính 大正	1530–1540 CE	11 years	Usage continued by Mạc Hiến Tông upon his ascension to the throne.
Mạc Hiến Tông 莫憲宗 (r. 1540–1546 CE)
Quảng Hòa 廣和	1541–1546 CE	6 years	
Mạc Tuyên Tông 莫宣宗 (r. 1546–1561 CE)
Vĩnh Định 永定	1547–1548 CE	2 years	Usage might be in 1547 CE, for a total length of 1 year.
Cảnh Lịch 景曆	1548–1555 CE	8 years	Usage might be from 1548 CE to 1553 CE, for a total length of 6 years; or from 1548 CE to 1554 CE, for a total length of 7 years.
Quang Bảo 光寶	1555–1564 CE	10 years	Usage might be from 1554 CE to 1561 CE, for a total length of 8 years; or from 1554 CE to 1564 CE, for a total length of 11 years. Usage continued by Mạc Mậu Hợp upon his ascension to the throne.
Mạc Mậu Hợp 莫茂洽 (r. 1562–1592 CE)
Thuần Phúc 淳福	1565–1568 CE	4 years	Usage might be from 1562 CE to 1566 CE, for a total length of 5 years; or from 1565 CE to 1566 CE, for a total length of 2 years.
Sùng Khang 崇康	1568–1578 CE	11 years	Usage might be from 1566 CE to 1578 CE, for a total length of 13 years.
Diên Thành 延成	1578–1585 CE	8 years	
Đoan Thái 端泰	1585–1588 CE	4 years	Usage might be from 1586 CE to 1587 CE, for a total length of 2 years.
Hưng Trị 興治	1588–1591 CE	4 years	Usage might be from 1588 CE to 1590 CE, for a total length of 3 years.
Hồng Ninh 洪寧	1591–1592 CE	2 years	
Mạc Toàn 莫全 (r. 1592–1593 CE; as regent)
Vũ An 武安	1592 CE	1 year	
Mạc Kính Chỉ 莫敬止 (r. 1592–1593 CE)
Bảo Định 寶定	1592 CE	1 year	
Khang Hựu 康祐	1593 CE	1 year	
Mạc Kính Cung 莫敬恭 (r. 1593–1625 CE)
Càn Thống 乾統	1593–1625 CE	33 years	
Mạc Kính Khoan 莫敬寬 (r. 1618–1638 CE)
Long Thái 隆泰	1618–1625 CE	8 years	
Mạc Kính Vũ 莫敬宇 (r. 1661–1679 CE)
Thuận Đức 順德	1638–1677 CE	40 years	Usage might be from 1638 CE to 1661 CE, for a total length of 24 years.
Mạc Nguyên Thanh 莫元清 (r. 1638–1677 CE)
Vĩnh Xương 永昌	1661–1679 CE	19 years	

=== Revival Lê dynasty ===
Era name	Period of use	Length of use	Remark
Lê Trang Tông 黎莊宗 (r. 1533–1548 CE)
Nguyên Hòa 元和	1533–1548 CE	16 years	Usage continued by Lê Trung Tông upon his ascension to the throne.
Lê Trung Tông 黎中宗 (r. 1548–1556 CE)
Thuận Bình 順平	1549–1556 CE	8 years	Usage continued by Lê Anh Tông upon his ascension to the throne.
Lê Anh Tông 黎英宗 (r. 1556–1573 CE)
Thiên Hựu 天祐	1557 CE	1 year	
Chính Trị 正治	1558–1571 CE	14 years	
Hồng Phúc 洪福	1572 CE	1 year	
Lê Thế Tông 黎世宗 (r. 1573–1599 CE)
Gia Thái 嘉泰	1573–1577 CE	5 years	
Quang Hưng 光興	1578–1599 CE	22 years	Usage continued by Lê Kính Tông upon his ascension to the throne.
Lê Kính Tông 黎敬宗 (r. 1599–1619 CE)
Thận Đức 慎德	1600 CE	1 year	
Hoằng Định 弘定	1600–1619 CE	20 years	
Lê Thần Tông 黎神宗 (r. 1619–1643 CE; first reign)
Vĩnh Tộ 永祚	1619–1629 CE	11 years	
Đức Long 德隆	1629–1635 CE	7 years	
Dương Hòa 陽和	1635–1643 CE	9 years	
Lê Chân Tông 黎真宗 (r. 1643–1649 CE)
Phúc Thái 福泰	1643–1649 CE	7 years	
Lê Thần Tông 黎神宗 (r. 1649–1662 CE; second reign)
Khánh Đức 慶德	1649–1653 CE	5 years	
Thịnh Đức 盛德	1653–1658 CE	6 years	
Vĩnh Thọ 永壽	1658–1662 CE	5 years	
Vạn Khánh 萬慶	1662 CE	1 year	Usage continued by Lê Huyền Tông upon his ascension to the throne.
Lê Huyền Tông 黎玄宗 (r. 1662–1671 CE)
Cảnh Trị 景治	1663–1671 CE	9 years	Usage continued by Lê Gia Tông upon his ascension to the throne.
Lê Gia Tông 黎嘉宗 (r. 1671–1675 CE)
Dương Đức 陽德	1672–1674 CE	3 years	
Đức Nguyên 德元	1674–1675 CE	2 years	Usage continued by Lê Hy Tông upon his ascension to the throne.
Lê Hy Tông 黎熙宗 (r. 1675–1705 CE)
Vĩnh Trị 永治	1676–1680 CE	5 years	
Chính Hòa 正和	1680–1705 CE	26 years	
Lê Dụ Tông 黎裕宗 (r. 1705–1729 CE)
Vĩnh Thịnh 永盛	1705–1720 CE	16 years	
Bảo Thái 保泰	1720–1729 CE	10 years	
Lê Duy Phường 黎維祊 (r. 1729–1732 CE)
Vĩnh Khánh 永慶	1729–1732 CE	4 years	
Lê Thuần Tông 黎純宗 (r. 1732–1735 CE)
Long Đức 龍德	1732–1735 CE	4 years	
Lê Ý Tông 黎懿宗 (r. 1735–1740 CE)
Vĩnh Hựu 永祐	1735–1740 CE	6 years	
Lê Hiển Tông 黎顯宗 (r. 1740–1786 CE)
Cảnh Hưng 景興	1740–1786 CE	47 years	Usage continued by Lê Mẫn Đế upon his ascension to the throne. Also used by the Nguyễn lords.
Lê Mẫn Đế 黎愍帝 (r. 1786–1789 CE)
Chiêu Thống 昭統	1787–1789 CE	3 years	

==== Other regimes contemporaneous with Revival Lê dynasty ====
Era name	Period of use	Length of use	Remark
Lê Hiến 黎憲 (r. 1533–1537 CE)
Quang Chiếu 光照	1533–1536 CE	4 years	
Vũ Đăng 武登 (r. 1594 CE)
La Bình 羅平	1594 CE	1 year	
Nguyễn Minh Trí 阮明智 (r. 1595–1597 CE)
Đại Đức 大德	1595–1597 CE	3 years	
Nguyễn Đương Minh 阮當明 (r. 1596–1597 CE)
Phúc Đức 福德	1596–1597 CE	2 years	

=== Tây Sơn dynasty ===
Era name	Period of use	Length of use	Remark
Thái Đức Đế 泰德帝 (r. 1778–1793 CE)
Thái Đức 泰德	1778–1793 CE	16 years	
Quang Trung Đế 光中帝 (r. 1788–1792 CE)
Quang Trung 光中	1788–1792 CE	5 years	Usage continued by Cảnh Thịnh Đế upon his ascension to the throne.
Cảnh Thịnh Đế 景盛帝 (r. 1792–1802 CE)
Cảnh Thịnh 景盛	1793–1801 CE	9 years	
Bảo Hưng 寶興	1801–1802 CE	2 years	

=== Nguyễn dynasty ===
Era name	Period of use	Length of use	Remark
Gia Long Đế 嘉隆帝 (r. 1802–1820 CE)
Gia Long 嘉隆	1802–1819 CE	18 years	
Minh Mạng Đế 明命帝 (r. 1820–1841 CE)
Minh Mạng 明命	1820–1841 CE	22 years	
Thiệu Trị Đế 紹治帝 (r. 1841–1847 CE)
Thiệu Trị 紹治	1841–1847 CE	7 years	Usage continued by Tự Đức Đế upon his ascension to the throne.
Tự Đức Đế 嗣德帝 (r. 1847–1883 CE)
Tự Đức 嗣德	1848–1883 CE	36 years	Usage continued by Dục Đức Đế, Hiệp Hòa Đế, and Kiến Phúc Đế upon their ascension to the throne. The Gregorian calendar has been used in Vietnam since the region was colonized by France in 1858.
Hiệp Hòa Đế 協和帝 (r. 1883 CE)
Hiệp Hòa 協和	did not use	did not use	The era name Hiệp Hòa was originally planned to supersede Tự Đức, but Hiệp Hòa Đế was deposed before the era name was put into effective use.
Kiến Phúc Đế 建福帝 (r. 1883–1884 CE)
Kiến Phúc 建福	1884 CE	1 year	Usage continued by Hàm Nghi Đế upon his ascension to the throne.
Hàm Nghi Đế 咸宜帝 (r. 1884–1885 CE)
Hàm Nghi 咸宜	1885 CE	1 year	Usage continued by Đồng Khánh Đế upon his ascension to the throne. Also used by the Cần Vương movement.
Đồng Khánh Đế 同慶帝 (r. 1885–1889 CE)
Đồng Khánh 同慶	1885–1889 CE	5 years	
Thành Thái Đế 成泰帝 (r. 1889–1907 CE)
Thành Thái 成泰	1889–1907 CE	19 years	
Duy Tân Đế 維新帝 (r. 1907–1916 CE)
Duy Tân 維新	1907–1916 CE	10 years	
Khải Định Đế 啓定帝 (r. 1916–1925 CE)
Khải Định 啓定	1916–1925 CE	10 years	Usage continued by Bảo Đại Đế upon his ascension to the throne.
Bảo Đại Đế 保大帝 (r. 1926–1945 CE)
Bảo Đại 保大	1926–1945 CE	20 years	

== See also ==
- List of Vietnamese monarchs
- Family tree of Vietnamese monarchs
