= Mạc =

Mạc (chữ Hán: 莫) is a Vietnamese surname. The name is transliterated as Ma or Mu in Chinese and Mua in Hmong language. It is unrelated to the "Mac" prefix to surnames derived from Gaelic languages.

Mac / Mc is an anglicised variation of the surname Mạc.

== Notable people with the surname Mạc ==
- Mạc Đĩnh Chi, Vietnamese scholar and official of the Trần dynasty (1272–1346)
- Mạc Cửu, a Chinese adventurer who played a role in relations between Cambodia and the Nguyễn court
- Mạc dynasty, ruled the northern provinces of Vietnam from 1527 until 1592
- Mạc Đăng Dung, Vietnamese emperor and the founder of the Mạc dynasty (1483–1541)
- Mạc Đăng Doanh, Vietnamese emperor and the second emperor of the Mạc dynasty (?–1540)
- Mạc Hiến Tông, Vietnamese emperor and the third emperor of the Mạc dynasty (?–1546)
- Mạc Tuyên Tông, Vietnamese emperor and the fourth emperor of the Mạc dynasty (?–1561)
- Mạc Mậu Hợp, Vietnamese emperor and the fifth emperor of the Mạc dynasty (1560–1592)
