= Mạc Toàn =

Mạc Toàn 莫全
- Emperor of Annam

Emperor of Mạc Dynasty
- Reign: 1592–1593
- Predecessor: Mạc Anh Tổ
- Successor: Mạc Mẫn Tông
- Born: ? Đông Kinh
- Died: 1593; Đông Kinh
- Burial: Hải Phòng city
Names
- Mạc Toàn (莫全)
Era dates
- Võ An (武安)
Posthumous name
- Khai Thiên Xung Địa An Văn Đoạt Võ Thành emperor (开天冲地安文奋武成皇帝)
Temple name
- Cảnh Tông (景宗)
- House: Mạc Dynasty
- Father: Mạc Anh Tổ
- Mother: ?

Mạc Toàn (chữ Hán: 莫全; ?–1593) emperor Võ An đế was the sixth emperor of the Mạc dynasty, and effectively the last of the dynasty. He reigned briefly from 1592–1593, following the death of Mạc Mậu Hợp and was followed by various nominal leaders of the Mạc: Mạc Kính Chỉ (1592–1593), Mạc Kính Cung (1593–1594), Mạc Kính Khoan (1594–1628) and Mạc Kính Vũ (1628–1677).

Preceded by Mạc Mậu Hợp	Emperor of Vietnam; 1592–1593	Succeeded by Mạc Kính Chỉ; Mạc reduced to the status of local lords at Cao Bằng
