= Reign title =

Reign title may refer to:

- Chinese era name
- Japanese era name
- Korean era name
- Vietnamese era name
