= Hien Tong =

Hiến Tông (憲宗) and Hiển Tông (顯宗) are different temple names used for several emperors of Vietnam, derived from the Chinese equivalents Xiànzōng and Xiǎnzōng respectively.

Hien Tong may refer to:

- Trần Hiến Tông (1319–1341, reigned 1329–1341), emperor of the Trần dynasty
- Lê Hiến Tông (1461–1504, reigned 1497–1504), emperor of the Lê dynasty
- Mạc Hiến Tông (died 1546, reigned 1540–1546), emperor of the Mạc dynasty
- Lê Hiển Tông (1717–1786, reigned 1740–1786), emperor of the Lê dynasty

== See also ==
- Xianzong (disambiguation), Chinese equivalent
