= Era =

Span of time defined for the purposes of chronology or historiography

An era is a span of time defined for the purposes of chronology or historiography, as in the regnal eras in the history of a given monarchy, a calendar era used for a given calendar, or the geological eras defined for the history of Earth.

Comparable terms are epoch, age, period, saeculum, aeon (Greek aion) and yuga (Sanskrit युग).

== Etymology ==
The word has been in use in English since 1615, and is derived from Late Latin aera "an era or epoch from which time is reckoned," probably identical to Latin æra "counters used for calculation," plural of æs "brass, money".

The Latin word use in chronology seems to have begun in 5th century Visigothic Spain, where it appears in the History of Isidore of Seville, and in later texts. The Spanish era is calculated from 38 BC, Before Christ, perhaps because of a tax (cfr. indiction) levied in that year, or due to a miscalculation of the Battle of Actium, which occurred in 31 BC.

Like epoch, "era" in English originally meant "the starting point of an age"; the meaning "system of chronological notation" is c. 1646; that of "historical period" is 1741.

== Use in chronology ==
In chronology, an "era" is the highest level for the organization of the measurement of time. A "calendar era" indicates a span of many years which are numbered beginning at a specific reference date (epoch), which often marks the origin of a political state or cosmology, dynasty, ruler, the birth of a leader, or another significant historical or mythological event; it is generally called after its focus accordingly as in "Victorian era".

=== Geological era ===
In large-scale natural science, there is need for another time perspective, independent from human activity, and indeed spanning a far longer period (mainly prehistoric), where "geologic era" refers to well-defined time spans. The next-larger division of geologic time is the eon. The Phanerozoic Eon, for example, is subdivided into eras. There are currently three eras defined in the Phanerozoic; the following table lists them from youngest to oldest (BP is an abbreviation for "before present").

Era	Beginning (millions of years BP)	End (millions of years BP)
Cenozoic	66.038	N/A
Mesozoic	252.17	66.038
Paleozoic	542	252.17

The older Proterozoic and Archean eons are also divided into eras.

=== Cosmological era ===
For periods in the history of the universe, the term "epoch" is typically preferred, but "era" is used e.g. of the "Stelliferous Era".

=== Calendar eras ===
Calendar eras count the years since a particular date (epoch), often one with religious significance. Anno mundi (year of the world) refers to a group of calendar eras based on a calculation of the age of the world, assuming it was created as described in the Book of Genesis. In Jewish religious contexts one of the versions is still used, and many Eastern Orthodox religious calendars used another version until 1728. Hebrew year 5772 AM began at sunset on 28 September 2011 and ended on 16 September 2012. In the Western church, Anno Domini (AD also written CE), counting the years since the birth of Jesus on traditional calculations, was always dominant.

The Islamic calendar, which also has variants, counts years from the Hijra or emigration of the Islamic prophet Muhammad from Mecca to Medina, which occurred in 622 AD. The Islamic year is some days shorter than 365; January 2012 fell in 1433 AH ("After Hijra").

For a time ranging from 1872 to the Second World War, the Japanese used the imperial year system (kōki), counting from the year when the legendary Emperor Jimmu founded Japan, which occurred in 660 BC.

Many Buddhist calendars count from the death of the Buddha, which according to the most commonly used calculations was in 545–543 BCE or 483 BCE. Dates are given as "BE" for "Buddhist Era"; 2000 AD was 2543 BE in the Thai solar calendar.

Other calendar eras of the past counted from political events, such as the Seleucid era and the Ancient Roman ab urbe condita ("AUC"), counting from the foundation of the city.

=== Regnal eras ===
The word era also denotes the units used under a different, more arbitrary system where time is not represented as an endless continuum with a single reference year, but each unit starts counting from one again as if time starts again. The use of regnal years is a rather impractical system, and a challenge for historians if a single piece of the historical chronology is missing, and often reflects the preponderance in public life of an absolute ruler in many ancient cultures. Such traditions sometimes outlive the political power of the throne, and may even be based on mythological events or rulers who may not have existed (for example Rome numbering from the rule of Romulus and Remus). In a manner of speaking the use of the supposed date of the birth of Christ as a base year is a form of an era.

In East Asia, each emperor's reign may be subdivided into several reign periods, each being treated as a new era. The name of each was a motto or slogan chosen by the emperor. Different East Asian countries utilized slightly different systems, notably:

- Chinese eras
- Japanese era
- Korean eras
- Vietnamese eras

A similar practice survived in the United Kingdom until quite recently, but only for formal official writings: in daily life the ordinary year A.D. has been used for a long time, but Acts of Parliament were dated according to the years of the reign of the current monarch, so that "61 & 62 Vict c. 37" refers to the Local Government (Ireland) Act 1898 passed in the session of Parliament in the 61st/62nd year of the reign of Queen Victoria.

=== Historiography ===
"Era" can be used to refer to well-defined periods in historiography, such as the Roman era, Elizabethan era, Victorian era, etc. Use of the term for more recent periods or topical history might include Soviet era, and "musical eras" in the history of modern popular music, such as the "big band era", "disco era", etc.

== See also ==
- Periodization
- List of time periods
- List of archaeological periods
- Epoch – Reference point from which time is measured
