= Annan command =

Administrative region in Ming China

Annan command, Annam command, or Annan dutongshisi, (Note: Simplified Chinese: 安南都统使司; traditional Chinese: 安南都統使司; pinyin: Ānnán Dūtǒngshǐsī; Vietnamese: An Nam Đô thống sứ ty) was a nominal administrative unit of the Ming dynasty of China established in Đại Việt, also known as Annan or Annam (present-day northern Vietnam). When the Mạc dynasty usurped the Lê dynasty's throne in Đại Việt, the Ming emperor Jiajing used the opportunity to send envoys demanding an explanation. At the time, the Mạc were occupied with military campaigns in the south and had little choice but to submit to Ming authority in order to secure their northern frontier. The Ming subsequently downgraded Đại Việt from a tributary state to a subordinate territory. Although nominally under Chinese authority and administered by local officials, the Viet rulers—who continued to style themselves emperors—retained control over domestic affairs from 1540 to 1647.

== History ==
Đại Việt (known to the Chinese as Annan, in present-day northern Vietnam) had been politically independent from China since the 10th century. In 1407, taking advantage of a political crisis in Đại Việt, the Ming dynasty invaded and conquered the country, incorporating it into China as Jiaozhi Province. A strong local resistance movement led by Lê Lợi successfully regained independence in 1428, establishing the Lê dynasty. Relations between the Ming and the Lê dynasty remained stable for the next century.

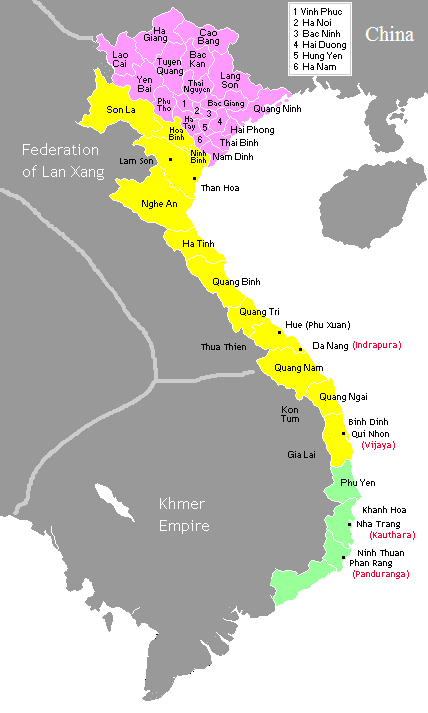
Đai Việt c. 1540, showing the Mạc dynasty in control of the north (pink), while Lê loyalists under the Nguyễn–Trịnh alliance controlled the south (yellow). Champa (green) was a vassal state.

In 1527, Mạc Đăng Dung, a powerful minister of the Lê dynasty, forced Lê Cung Hoàng (r. 1522–1527) to abdicate and established the Mạc dynasty. The new dynasty retained its capital at Thăng Long (present-day Hanoi). The former Lê general Nguyễn Kim fled to Lan Xang (Ai Lao; present-day Laos) with his family after Đăng Dung's usurpation and later rallied forces in an attempt to restore the Lê dynasty. In 1532, he found the Lê prince Ninh in Ai Lao and proclaimed him emperor as Lê Trang Tông. Establishing a base in Thanh Hóa, Nguyễn Kim began the Lê loyalist restoration movement, which initiated a turbulent era in Đại Việt as his followers, later dominated by the Trịnh clan, waged war against the Mạc dynasty in the north.

In late 1529, Mạc Đăng Dung abdicated in favor of his son Đăng Doanh, who ascended the throne as Mạc Thái Tông. Đăng Dung assumed the title of retired emperor (Thái thượng hoàng). In 1537, Lê Trang Tông dispatched envoys to Beijing, petitioning the Ming court to intervene by accusing the Mạc clan of usurping the Lê dynasty's throne. The Jiajing Emperor responded by appointing Qiu Luan as commander-in-chief and Mao Bowen (毛伯溫) as military advisor to prepare a military expedition against Đại Việt, while stationing troops near the border to pressure the Mạc. Facing the threat of a large-scale Ming intervention, Đăng Dung submitted in March 1539, sending envoys to Zhennan Pass to present Đại Việt's land and population registers—a symbolic act acknowledging Ming suzerainty while allowing him to retain de facto control over the country.

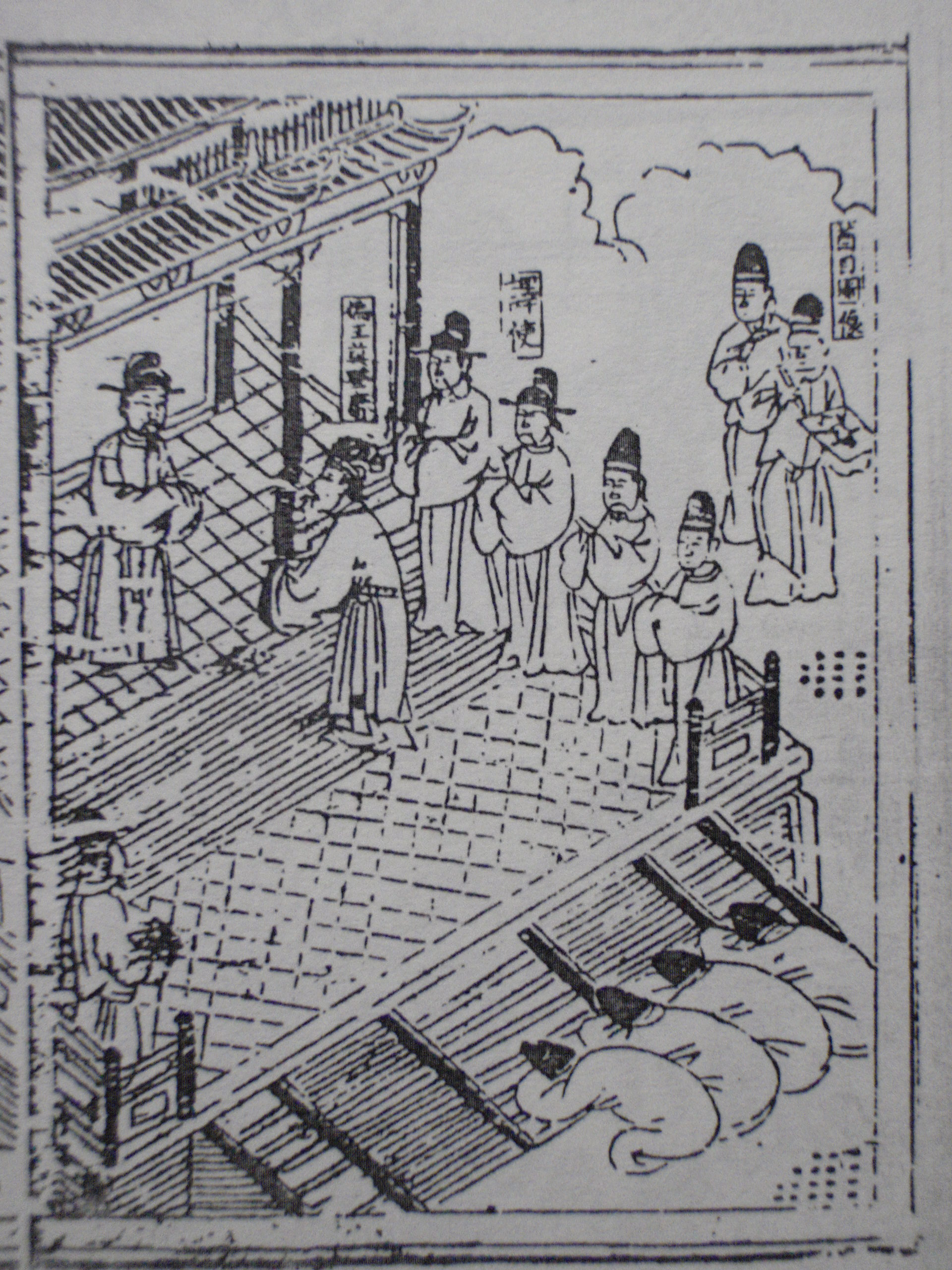
Mạc Đăng Dung's Surrender, illustration from the Annan laiwei tuce (安南來威圖冊; 'Graphic Account of the Overawing of Annam'), 1571, p. 391

On 30 November 1540, Mạc Đăng Dung and dozens of officials surrendered to Ming officials at the Zhennan Pass, binding themselves and kneeling down as a sign of submission. The Ming dynasty then nominally demoted Đại Việt from a vassal state (國; guo; quốc) to a subordinate territory (都統使司; dutongshisi; Đô thống sứ ty). The thirteen provinces (đạo) of Đại Việt were renamed as thirteen pacification commissions (宣撫司; xuanfusi; Tuyên phủ ty), each with a pacification commissioner (宣撫使; xuanfushi; Tuyên phủ sứ), pacification associate commissioner (同知; tongzhi; Đồng tri), pacification vice commissioner (副使; fushi; Phó sứ), and pacification assistant commissioner (僉事; qianshi; Thiêm sự), all under the commandant (都統; dutong; Đô thống), who served as the region's highest military and administrative official. Mạc Đăng Dung was appointed commandant of Annan (安南都統使; An Nam Đô thống sứ), granted a second-class hereditary rank only slightly higher than that of a native chieftain, and required to pay tribute every three years.

In 1592, the Lê–Trịnh forces captured Thăng Long, leading to the restoration of the Lê dynasty. Lê Thế Tông (r. 1573–1599) sent envoys to the Ming court requesting recognition as king of Annan (安南國王; An Nam Quốc vương). However, the Ming court remained uncertain about the political situation in Đại Việt and appointed him only as the commandant of Annan. The Ming required the Lê dynasty to cede Cao Bằng and Thái Nguyên provinces to the descendants of the Mạc family. Despite the reluctance of Lê dynasty rulers and officials, they were obliged to allow the Mạc family to retain control of Cao Bằng. The Lê rulers maintained the title of commandant of Annan until 1647, when the Southern Ming reinstated the retired Lê emperor Thần Tông as king of Annan. The Mạc family continued to rule Cao Bằng until 1667, when the Trịnh conquered the region. The Qing dynasty, which had succeeded the Ming in 1644, ordered the Trịnh to return Cao Bằng to the Mạc in 1669. It was not until 1677, when the Mạc joined Wu Sangui in his rebellion against the Qing, that the Trịnh were allowed to conquer Cao Bằng.
