= Friedensau Adventist University =

Coordinates: 52°12′42″N 11°59′03″E

- Theologische Hochschule Friedensau
- Type: Public
- Established: 1899
- Chancellor: Tobias H. Koch
- Rector: Roland E. Fischer
- Students: 200 (2019)
- Location: Möckern, Germany
- Website: www.thh-friedensau.de
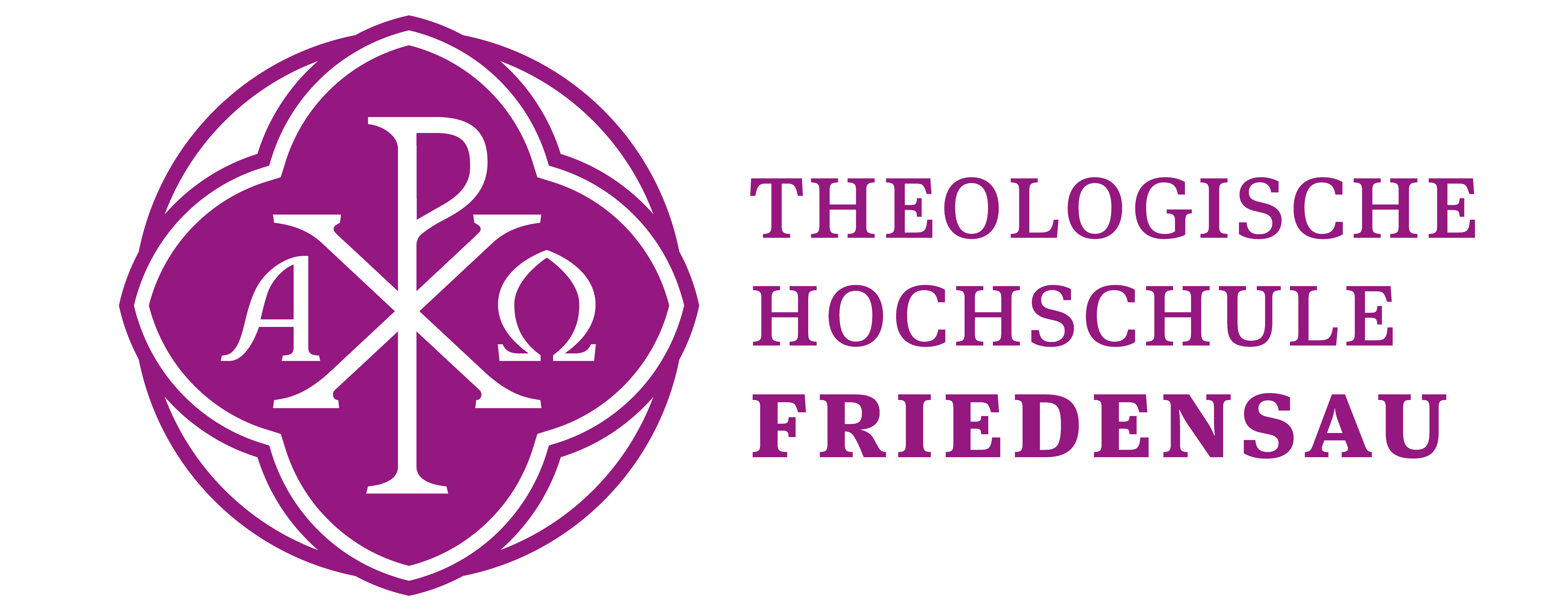

Friedensau Adventist University (in German "Theologische Hochschule Friedensau") is a part of the Seventh-day Adventist education system, the world's second largest Christian school system.

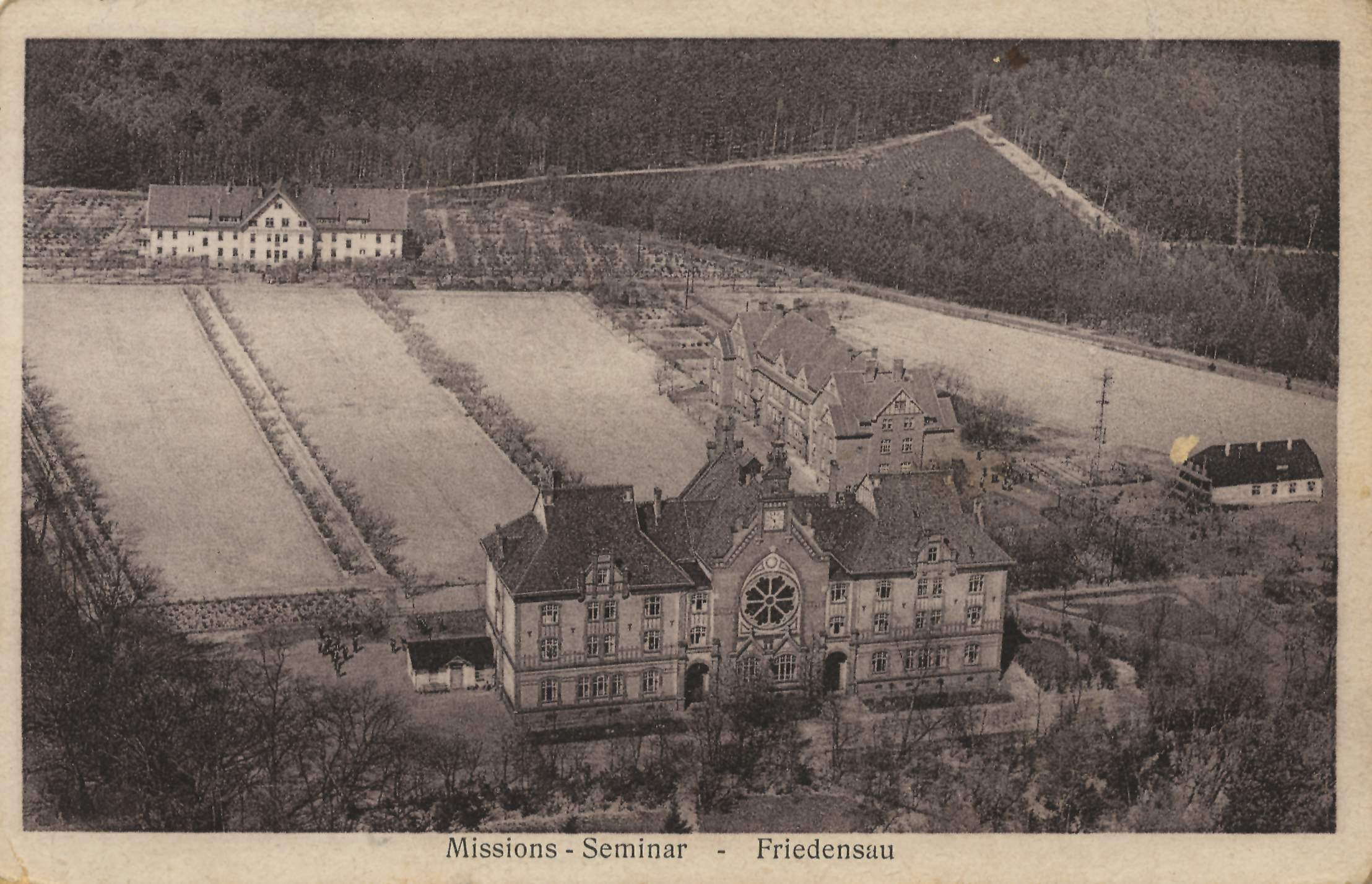
The initial buildings, short after completion

Located in the village of Friedensau, approximately 120 km from Berlin, the university was established in 1899, and is the oldest Seventh-day Adventist owned university in Europe. Its courses of study and degrees are accredited by the German government. Classes are offered in both German and English and the campus is bilingual.

As of 2017, the university had 200 students from 30 countries taking accredited German language courses, including students studying abroad for a year and transferring their studies taken at Friedensau back to their home institutions.

The university is also home to a guesthouse, conference facilities, and an outdoor adventure campground, all of which attract visitors each year. The village of Friedensau is home to the Seniorenheim retirement village.

The southern half of the village with the school buildings is listed as heritage site of historic, cultural, artistic and urbanistic significance.

== History ==
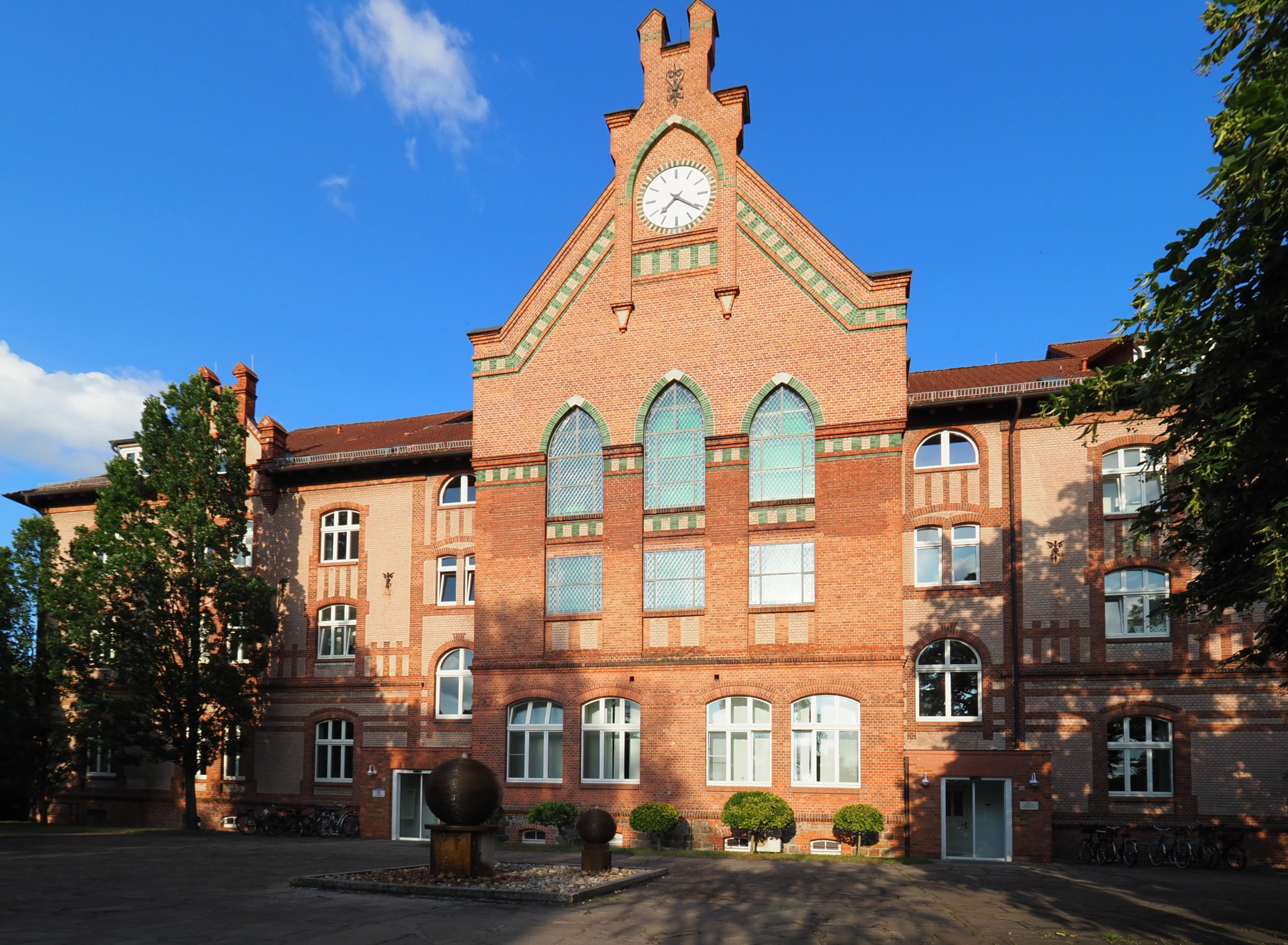
Rectorate and chapel building

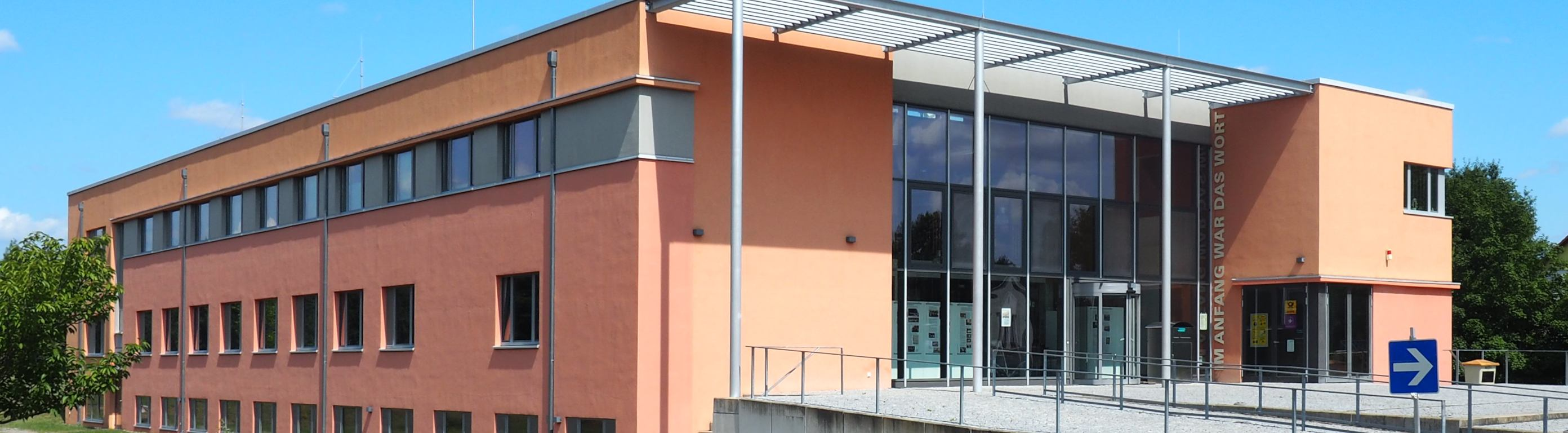
New library

In the autumn of 1899, initiated by Ludwig Richard Conradi, the Seventh-day Adventist Church, purchased a centuries-old mill, along with the surrounding farmland, to found the village of Friedensau and their first mission school in Europe. On November 19, 1899, lessons began for the first seven students.

Within the next ten years, a collection of large school buildings and living quarters emerged on the campus that still stand today and are local landmarks synonymous with Friedensau. Based on a holistic pedagogic concept, a sanatorium, workshops and a health-food factory were added, providing opportunities for both practical work experience and income for the pupils at the same time. In this way, Friedensau grew quickly to become a Missions and Industrial School which was visited by up to 250 pupils each year until the First World War.

During the First World War, the War Department set up a military hospital in the buildings. It was not until 1919 that training could be resumed once more. In the following years, new courses were offered (home economics, preparation for nurses' training, 10th grade secondary education, business and child care). In 1923, the school was renamed to "Mission Seminary Friedensau". In 1930, the seminary was awarded state approval for courses in home economics and business by the chief administrator of the government for the region of Magdeburg.

The Nazi-era brought many restrictions, and finally the school was again closed during the Second World War. Once more, the buildings served for the care of wounded and sick soldiers, first for the German Wehrmacht and then for the Soviet Army.

Through recommendations from the then Minister-President of Saxony-Anhalt, Erhard Huebener, the Soviet military administration permitted the Seminary to reopen in 1947. This made Friedensau the first church-run educational institute in the Soviet occupation zone that was allowed to resume educational activity. During the DDR-regime, the socialist government only allowed for the training of church employees. Besides the training of ministers, the seminary offered one-year social welfare work training programs. The nature and quality of such training resulted in another name change, "Theological Seminary Friedensau". Two years later, the General Conference of Seventh-day Adventists accredited the Seminary as a senior college. At this time it was once more possible for Friedensau to offer training to students from other socialist states in Eastern Europe and Africa to become pastors.

On September 15, 1990, the Theological Seminary received the status of a state-recognized university following a resolution from the DDR Council of Ministers. Since then, in addition to the Theological Faculty (which has been offering a Diploma in Theology since 1992), a Christian Social Science Faculty has been established. Presently, besides the Diploma and Bachelor's courses in Theology and Christian Social Work, Master's programmes in Theology, Counseling, Social Work, and International Social Sciences (International Development) can also be taken as well as a preparatory course for musical studies. From late 2008 on, Friedensau is the first institution to offer a concentration in Adventist Studies at the Master's level. Further degrees, for example in Music Therapy, started in 2011. There are currently approximately 200 full-time students registered in both faculties.

== Courses of Study ==
- Social Science, B.A.
- Social and Nursing Studies, B.A.
- International Social Sciences, M.A. (English-medium)
- Counseling, M.A.
- Music Therapy, M.A.
- Social and Health Management, M.A.
- Theology, B.A. and M.A.
- Master of Theological Studies (M.T.S.) , with specializations in Adventist Studies or in Mission Studies (English-medium)
- ACA-program ("Adventist Colleges Abroad") - combines language learning and a cultural experience

== See also ==
- List of Seventh-day Adventist colleges and universities
- Seventh-day Adventist education
- Seventh-day Adventist Church
- Seventh-day Adventist theology
- History of the Seventh-day Adventist Church
- Schulzentrum Marienhöhe, Darmstadt
