= Battle of Cao Bằng =

Battle of Cao Bằng may refer to:

- Battle of Cao Bằng (1677)
- Battle of Cao Bằng (1949)
- Battle of Cao Bằng (1979)
