= Mạc Kính Chỉ =

Mạc Kính Chỉ 莫敬止
- Emperor of Đại Việt

Emperor of Mạc Dynasty
- Reign: 1592–1593
- Predecessor: Mạc Mậu Hợp
- Successor: Mạc Kính Cung
- Born: ?
- Died: 1593
Names
- Mạc Kính Chỉ (莫敬止)
Era dates
- Bảo Định (寶定, 1592 – 1593); Khang Hựu (康佑, 1593 – 1593)
- House: Mạc dynasty
- Father: Mạc Kính Điển

Mạc Kính Chỉ (莫敬止, ?–1593) was the seventh emperor of the Mạc dynasty. He reigned briefly from 1592–1593.

He was the eldest son of Mạc Kính Điển. The emperor Mạc Mậu Hợp was captured by Trịnh lord in 1592, so he enthroned in Thanh Lâm. He led sixteen to seventeen thousand men, later, Mạc Toàn abdicated and surrendered to him.

In the next year, Chỉ was captured by two generals of Trịnh lord, Hoàng Đình Ái and Nguyễn Hữu Liêu, and executed in Thang Long.

Preceded by Mạc Mậu Hợp	Emperor of Vietnam; 1592–1593	Succeeded by Mạc Kính Cung
