= Battle of Cao Binh (1677) =

1677 defeat of Mạc by Revival Lê

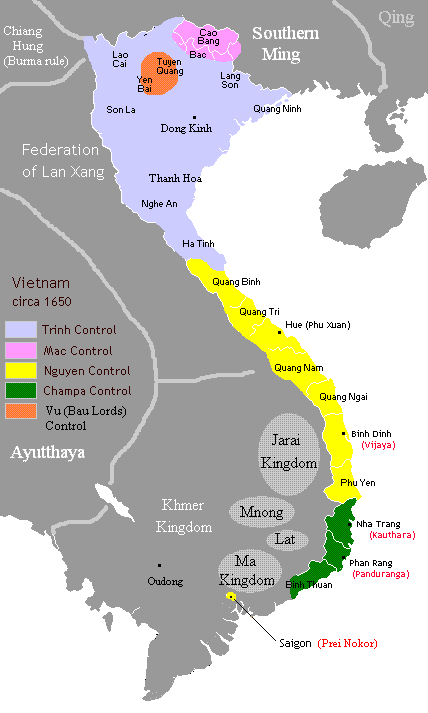
Map of Vietnam circa 1650, Mạc as rump state

Battle of Cao Binh or Fall of Cao Binh, was the last battle of the Mạc dynasty's army in Vietnam history, when Trịnh Lords's army attack Cao Binh Citadel - the last capital of the Mạc dynasty. The battle happened in August 1677, at Cao Bằng, North Vietnam. Trịnh Lords's army leading by commander Đinh Văn Tả and Nguyễn Hữu Đăng, with 100.000 troops. Mạc Kính Vũ emperor run away to China. Mạc force was defeated, bringing an end to the Lê-Mạc war and returingin the Cao Bằng territory back to Đại Việt.

== See also ==
- Mạc dynasty
- Trịnh Lords
