= Schulzentrum Marienhöhe =

Coordinates: 49°50′25″N 8°39′20″E

Marienhoehe Adventist Academy
- Schulzentrum Marienhöhe

Location
- Auf der Marienhoehe 32; Darmstadt, Hesse, 64297; Germany

Information
- Type: Private, Day & Boarding
- Established: 1924
- School number: 512817
- President: Christian Noack
- Chairperson: Gabriel E. Maurer
- Faculty: 29
- Grades: 1–12: Primary school; Intermediate school; Gymnasium
- Gender: Coeducational
- Language: English, French, German, Latin
- Accreditation: Adventist Accrediting Association
- Website: www.marienhoehe.de

Schulzentrum Marienhöhe or Marienhoehe Academy is a private K-12, co-educational Christian boarding school in Darmstadt, Germany. It is owned and operated by the Seventh-day Adventist Church. The school has close ties with Friedensau Adventist University. It is a part of the Seventh-day Adventist education system, the world's second largest Christian school system.

== History ==
In 1924, a group of Seventh-day Adventists bought a former gym and dance studio from Elizabeth Duncan. The estate was located on the slope of the Odenwald in Darmstadt-Eberstadt. The authorities in the state of Hesse then approved the establishment of a mission school. In 1925, a new building for the school workshops was built. Over the years, the number of workshops grew to nine: locksmith, carpentry, printing, upholstery, mattress manufacturing, knitting and others. Many students earned money from these workshops, with which they used to pay their tuition fees. Also, the number of teaching departments expanded. There was a seminary, a business school, a housekeeping school, preschool and nursing courses for educators and kindergarten teachers. In the 1927–28 school year, the school expanded to include a six-year course of preparation for higher education - today's high school equivalent. The students were prepared for graduation, at Marienhöhe, and entered into tertiary education in the Darmstadt region. The range of educational opportunities and the reputation of the seminary brought more students and pupils to the school each year. In the academic year 1928–29, enrolment peaked at 227 before the Second World War began.

=== War Years ===
In 1933, the Secret State Police closed the school. Books and money were seized and the classrooms, offices and printing plant was sealed. Students had to go home immediately. After seven weeks, the school ban was lifted. In 1934, the school ended its seminary course, and in 1936 it also ended its general course for higher education. Meanwhile, the number of pupils enrolled fell dramatically. On 1 April 1939, on a recommendation of the state's education department, the school decided to close as the small school roll could not justify its continued operation. Two years later, the site was still owned by the school and one of the school's businesses – mattress manufacturing – was still in operation.

In 1941, Marienhöhe was seized because of a military law by the military district command in Wiesbaden XII. Units of the armed forces moved into the houses and the site received a military face. Solid bunkers and a series of wooden barracks were built. After the war, the occupying Allies used the site as a camp for displaced people. In the summer of 1948, the school was no longer in the control of the Allied forces. The International Refugee Organization began clearing land and buildings. It became a neglected area with dirty smog covered buildings for many years.

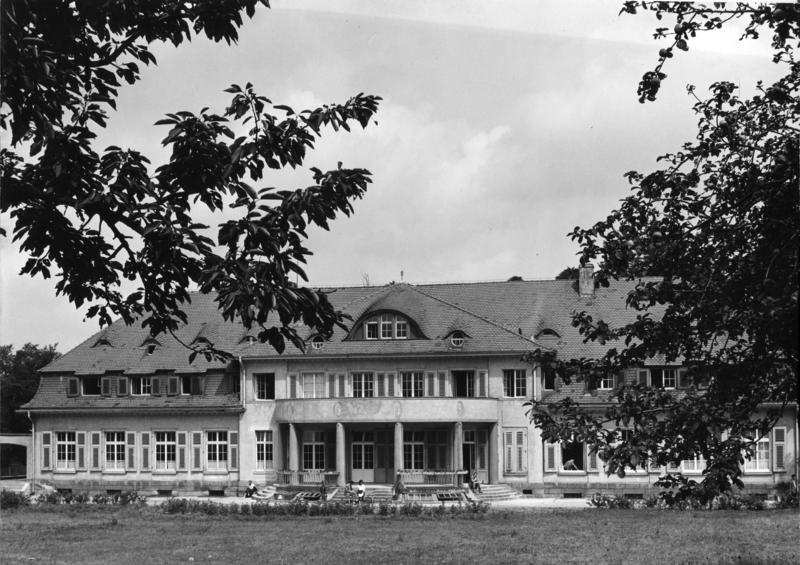
The main house from 1911, in 1957

In August 1948, 25 future students came together. Most were able to do handwork. Immediately, reconstruction, renovation and cleaning work began. In October 1948, the Marienhöhe school was ceremonially reopened after the new education authority gave their approval. The school began with the former seminary courses, housekeeping and nursing preschool. The workshops were later reopened. In the spring of 1949, the "old school house" was thoroughly overhauled. At the beginning of 1949–50 school year, the Hesse state government approved the operation of the school despite Marienhöhe only having one class of 7 students. On top of that, construction of a new gymnasium began. In December 1949, the foundations for the new classroom buildings were laid.

=== Post-War & Beyond ===
In the school year of 1950/51, the two initial classes which were originally held in the gym relocated to the new buildings. The school was reestablished in 1950. The enrolment also grew from 60 students in 1949 to 160 students in 1952. One day in 1952/53, a fire was started in the dormitory (located on the grounds of the seminary). Nearly all the occupants were absent when the fire broke out. The cause of the fire was unknown but many students lost all their belongings. The seminary students were temporarily moved into the "old school house". The girls lived in the upper floors of the main house. In 1953/54, on the location where the block had been, a three-storey stable building was erected as the "new students home". In the year 1954/55, a new teacher's house was built next to the "old school house". In the spring of 1955, the first matriculation examination was held at the school. Three girls and thirteen boys took part. They received good marks which aided in giving the school a good name.

The successful results from the first examination and the full class numbers lead to public recognition of the grammar school in Hesse. In the school year of 1956/57, the school received state recognition by the Federal Republic. In the year of 1959/60, a new division of mathematical science, and another division were introduced. Students at Year 11 were able to choose between the two.

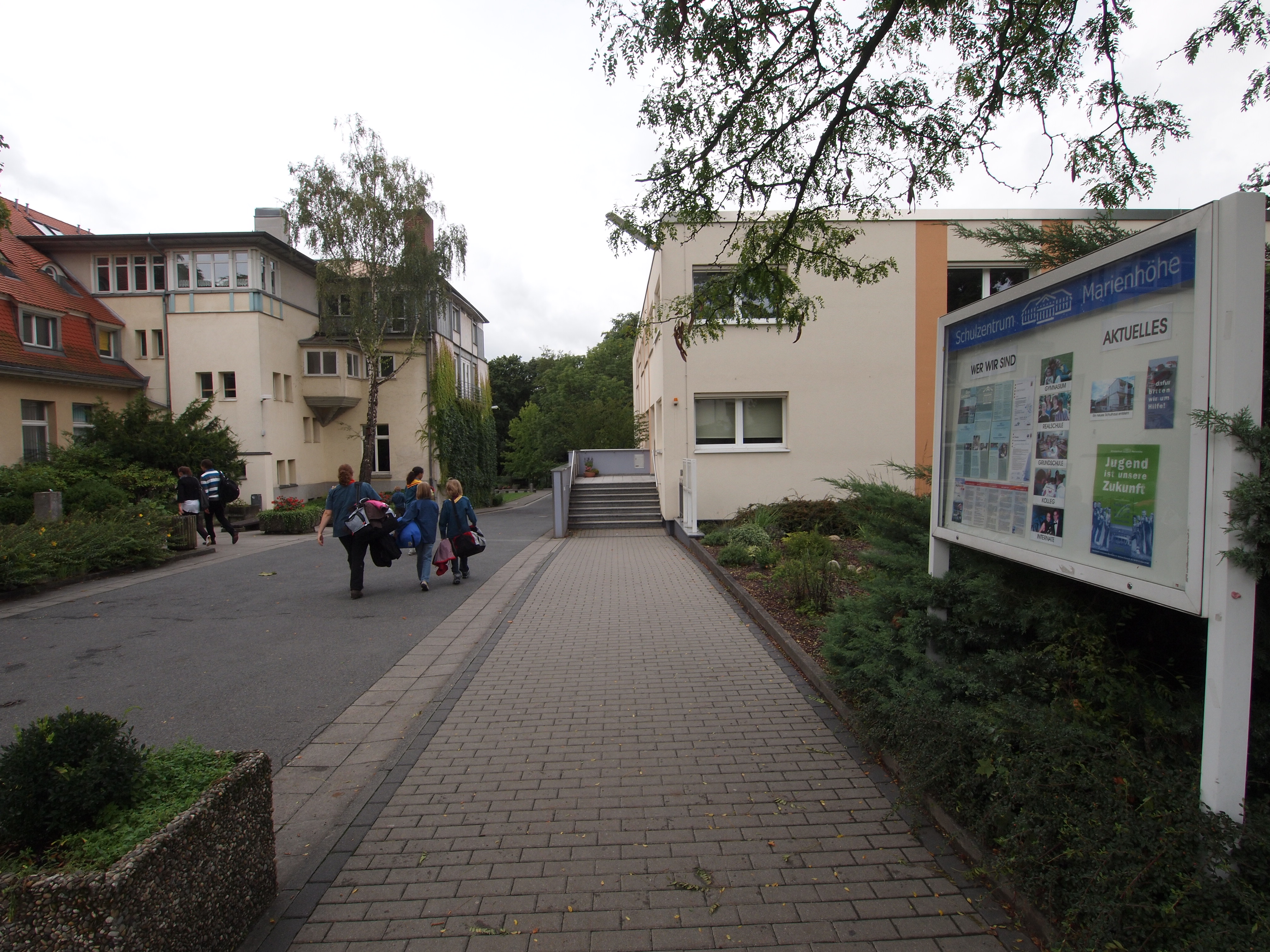
Entrance 2011

== Curriculum ==
=== High school ===
Once in high school students enter either Realschule or gymnasien depending on academic and overall performance.

== Boarding ==
The boarding program is open to students aged 14 and above. There are two boarding houses: one for girls and the other for boys.

== See also ==
- List of Seventh-day Adventist secondary and elementary schools
- Seventh-day Adventist education
- Seventh-day Adventist Church
- Seventh-day Adventist theology
- History of the Seventh-day Adventist Church
- List of schools in Germany
