= Xianzong =

Xianzong may refer to:

- Emperor Xianzong of Tang (憲宗) (778–820; reigned 805–820), Chinese emperor of the Tang Dynasty
- Emperor Xianzong of Western Xia (獻宗) (1181–1226; reigned 1223-1226), Tangut emperor of the Western Xia Dynasty
- Möngke Khan (1209–1259), Mongol Khan, posthumously known as Emperor Xianzong (憲宗) of the Yuan Dynasty
- Chenghua Emperor (1447–1487; reigned 1464–1487), Chinese emperor of the Ming Dynasty, also known as Emperor Xianzong (憲宗) of the Ming Dynasty

== See also ==
- Hien Tong (disambiguation), Vietnamese equivalents
