= Regnal year =

Year of the reign of a sovereign

A regnal year is a year of the reign of a sovereign, from the Latin regnum meaning kingdom, rule. Regnal years considered the date as an ordinal, not a cardinal number. For example, a monarch could have a first year of rule, a second year of rule, a third year of rule, and so on, but not a zeroth year of rule.

Applying this ancient epoch system to modern calculations of time, which include zero, is what led to the debate over when the third millennium began. Regnal years are "finite era names", contrary to "infinite era names" such as Christian era, Jimmu era, Juche era, and so on.

== Early use ==
In ancient times, calendars were counted in terms of the number of years of the reign of the current monarch. Reckoning long periods of time required a king list. The oldest such reckoning is preserved in the Sumerian king list. Ancient Egyptian chronology was also dated using regnal years. The Zoroastrian calendar also operated with regnal years following the reform of Ardashir I in the 3rd century.

The Canon of Kings is a list that dates the reigns of various Babylonian, Persian, Macedonian, Egyptian, and Roman monarchs, that was used by ancient astronomers as a way to date astronomical phenomena. The Liberian Catalogue is a similar list of popes of Early Christianity, that was used to date early events in the religion's history. The Holy See continued to use Regnal years on coinage until 2001, dropping the practice with the switch to the Euro.

== Sinosphere era names ==
Regnal years were generally used for year marking in the Chinese cultural sphere before the advent of era names. In China, the continuous use of era names began in 140 BC, during the rule of the Emperor Wu of Han. Prior to that, years were usually marked as regnal years of the monarch.

Since 140 BC, era names served as titles for the purpose of numbering and identifying years. Era names were used for over two millennia by Chinese emperors and are still used in Japan.

The Lanfang Republic era, Republic of Formosa era and Republic of China calendar are systems adapted from the traditional era name system, but they are not effectively era names. The Confucius era and Juche era are based on the year of birth of the thinker or eternal president, respectively. The Huangdi era, Dangun era and kōki were counted in terms of the number of years of the reign of the first monarch.

As a result of Chinese cultural influence, other polities in the Sinosphere—Korea, Vietnam, Japan, and Ryukyu—also adopted the concept of era name.

Abolished era names may be reused, for example as a means of claiming or denying political legitimacy. An example of this is, that when the Yongle Emperor usurped the throne from his nephew he dated the year of his accession as 洪武三十五年, the 35th year of his father, the Hongwu Emperor's reign, i.e. 1402. Hongwu had in fact died in 1398, and the short reign of the Jianwen Emperor, who ruled between 1398 and 1402 was written out of the official record. However, they would sometimes still be used. 景初四年 (240) was used on Japanese bronze mirrors. 廣德四年 (766) and 建中八年 (787) were used in a Western Regions tomb and a document. Kuchlug did not change the era name.

After the Ming dynasty fell, the Joseon dynasty still used Chongzhen, and the Kingdom of Tungning still used Yongli regnal years, thus denying the legitimacy of the Qing dynasty, and showing continued allegiance to the Ming regime.

The short lived Daxi Kingdom, post Zhang Xianzhong, used the Ganzhi calendar without era names. Overseas Chinese used Longfei (龍飛) or Tianyun (天運).

=== Chinese ===
Chinese era names (年號, niánhào) were used since 140 BC. However, they are not considered to have been formally established until 110 BC, with the performance of the religious Feng Shan sacrifice at Mount Tai by Emperor Wu of Han, who used it to declare a new era called yuanfeng (元封). Emperor Wu then introduced another era name when he established the 'Great Beginning' (太初 Taichu) calendar in 104 BCE. The Western Han emperors thereafter had era names changed every four years, but subsequent Eastern Han emperors chose various lengths of time for era names and named them after events they considered to be auspicious. Until 1367 AD several were used during each emperor's reign. From 1368 AD until 1912 AD only one era name was used by each emperor of the Ming and Qing dynasties, who were posthumously known by their era names. This meant that the era name became equivalent to a regnal year. The tradition of Chinese era names survives in the Republic of China's Minguo calendar, with Minguo, Chinese for "Republic", taking the place of the era name.

=== Japanese ===
The official Japanese system or Gengō (元号) numbers years from the accession of the current emperor, regarding the calendar year during which the accession occurred as the first year. The system was in use sporadically from 645 and continuously from 701. Until 1867 several era names were used during each emperor's reign. From 1868, the "one reign, one era name" system was introduced, meaning only one has been used by each emperor. each emperor has been known posthumously by his era name.

The current emperor, Naruhito succeeded to the throne on 1 May 2019, after his father Akihito abdicated the throne, citing age and poor health. The name of his era is Reiwa, which was formally announced by the Government of Japan a month before Naruhito succeeded the throne, on 1 April 2019. Therefore, 1 May 2019 is considered the beginning of the Reiwa 1.

The former emperor, Akihito, succeeded the throne on 7 January 1989 on the death of his father Emperor Shōwa, with the name Heisei decreed as the name of his regnal era by the Cabinet. Thus the year 1989 corresponds to Heisei 1 (平成元年, Heisei gannen; or "first year").

Era names of Modern Japan (from 1868 CE)
Gregorian year	Era name	Era name (Kanji)	Emperor
1868 CE	Meiji	明治	Meiji (Mutsuhito)
1912 CE	Taishō	大正	Taishō (Yoshihito)
1926 CE	Shōwa	昭和	Shōwa (Hirohito)
1989 CE	Heisei	平成	Akihito
2019 CE	Reiwa	令和	Naruhito

=== Korean ===
The use of era names was common throughout the various historical states that occupied the Korean Peninsula. Korean endemic eras were used from 391 to 1274 and from 1894 to 1910. During the later years of the Joseon dynasty, years were also numbered from the founding of that dynasty in 1392. From 1952 until 1961, years were numbered in Dangi in South Korea, counting from the legendary founding of Gojoseon in 2333 BC.

During the Joseon dynasty, Korea used Chinese era names (yeonho) as a demonstration of its respect and loyalty to the Ming and Qing dynasties of China. Even after the Ming dynasty was replaced by Qing, Koreans continued to use the Ming era names, using the era name of the last Ming emperor, the Chongzhen Emperor, after his death in 1644, and continued to do so for nearly 200 years. However, this was done mostly privately, because of the pressure exerted by the Qing government.

The tradition of Korean era names was used in the North Korean Juche calendar from 1997 to 2024, with Juche year 1 being 1912, the year of the birth of Kim Il-sung.

=== Vietnamese ===
The use of era names in Vietnamese history started in the middle of the 6th century CE, when independent Vietnamese dynasties started to proclaim their own era names. The titles were adopted in historical Vietnam for the purpose of year identification and numbering. It continued until 1945, when the reign of Nguyễn dynasty came to an end.

== Indosphere ==
=== India ===
==== Odisha ====
The Anka year (Odia: ଅଙ୍କ Aṅka) system is a unique regnal year system instituted by the Eastern Ganga kings for dating their reigns. It has a number of features that mark the regnal year differently from the actual duration of the year elapsed during the reign. The system still survives today and is used in the Odia panjis to mark the titular regnal year of the King of Puri, Gajapati Maharaja Dibyasingha Deba of the Puri Estate, whose title carries the legacy of historical ruling monarchs of Odisha. It is also known as the Odisha style of dating.

Features:

- The Anka system always starts on the Odia fiscal new year called Sunia which falls on the 12th day of the bright fortnight of the month Bhadra (August–September) known as Bhādra Sukḷa Dwādasi. If the king accedes the throne for a few days before this date, then the first year of his reign would then just be a few days long.
- Coins were minted on the date of the new year and hence the first coins were given the Anka year 2, the number 1 was not used.
- All years ending in 6 were skipped. As in the Anka year 5 was followed by Anka year 7, Anka year 15 was followed by Anka year 17 and so on.
- All years ending in 0 were also skipped, except for the Anka year 10.

Hence no Anka years exist for 1, 6, 16, 20, 26, 30, 36, 40, 46, 50, 56 and so on.

Timeline of actual Regnal year and Anka year (shown till regnal year 30)
Regnal year	1	2	3	4	5	6	7	8	9	10	11	12	13	14	15	16	17	18	19	20	21	22	23	24	25	26	27	28	29	30
Anka year	2	3	4	5	7	8	9	10	11	12	13	14	15	17	18	19	21	22	23	24	25	27	28	29	31	32	33	34	35	37

Regnal & Anka year of Gajapati king of Puri (titular reign since 7 July 1970)
Gregorian year	Regnal year	Odia year	Anka year
2022 CE	52	୧୪୩୦ ଉତ୍କଳାବ୍ଦ; 1430 Utkaḷābda	୬୫ ଅଙ୍କ; 65 Aṅka

== Commonwealth realms ==
Regnal years continue to see limited use in some Commonwealth realms. The present conventions for regnal years in the Commonwealth realms originate with the Kingdom of England, which used regnal years to date its public documents. The start of a new regnal era in the English regnal dating system originally began on the date of the monarch's coronation. However, the system was changed in 1307 to begin on the date the monarch succeeds to the throne, beginning with the ascension of Edward II.

The regnal years used throughout the Commonwealth realms are identical to one another, as they share the same line of succession. The present monarch, Charles III, became the sovereign on 8 September 2022, after the death of his mother Elizabeth II. Thus, 8 September 2022 is considered the beginning of the first regnal year for Charles III; with the last day of each regnal year being 7 September.

Gregorian calendar	Regnal year
6 February 2022 CE to 8 September 2022 CE	71 Elizabeth II
8 September 2022 CE to 7 September 2023 CE	1 Charles III
8 September 2023 CE to 7 September 2024 CE	2 Charles III

=== Canada ===
The regnal dating system is used in the numbering system for all Acts of the Parliament of Canada. All Acts are given an individual chapter number, assigned by its numeric order of when it received royal assent, along with the regnal year, and the name of the reigning Monarch of Canada. The use of regnal years in legal citations is acceptable in Canadian legal practices, although usage of the Gregorian calendar is more common.

The regnal year was used throughout the legislative sessional volumes of the Legislative Assembly of Ontario, until it was replaced by the calendar year in 1949. However, the regnal year continues to be used on the title pages of the legislature's sessional volumes.

=== United Kingdom ===
The use of regnal years in the United Kingdom originated in the predecessor Kingdom of England. The regnal dating system was used to date documents of parliamentary sessions until 1963, when it began to date its documents using the Gregorian calendar. The change to the Gregorian calendar was legislated under the Acts of Parliament Numbering and Citation Act 1962.

== Similar practices ==
=== Republic of China ===
The calendar uses 1912, the year of the establishment of the Republic of China (ROC), as the first year. Although the system is not an era name or a regnal year, the ROC calendar traces its roots to the historical Chinese system of era names. The ROC calendar was officially used on Mainland China until 1949, and is still officially used by the Republic of China on Taiwan today.

=== United States ===
While not strictly a regnal year, time in the United States of America can be derived from the Declaration of Independence (July 4, 1776). For example, the U.S. Constitution is dated as signed in "the Year of our Lord one thousand seven hundred and Eighty seven and of the Independence of the United States of America the Twelfth," and Presidential proclamations will often be ended "IN WITNESS WHEREOF, I have hereunto set my hand this [ordinal] day of [month], in the year of our Lord [year], and of the Independence of the United States of America the [year]." 2026 is the 251st year of the Independence of the United States of America on and after July 4 of that year. Time is also sometimes reckoned in terms (and sessions, if necessary) of Congress; e.g. House of Representatives Bill 2 of the 112th Congress is dated "112th CONGRESS, 1st Session".
