= Mạc Thái Tông =

Mạc Thái Tông 莫太宗
- Emperor of Đại Việt
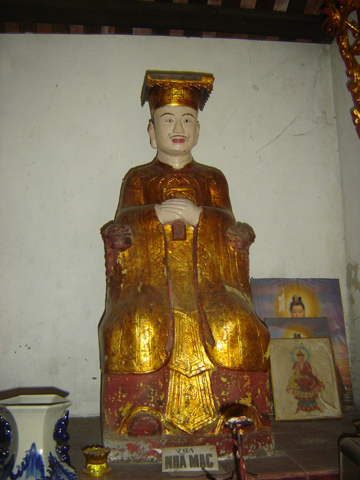

Emperor of Mạc Dynasty
- Reign: 1529 – 25 January 1540
- Predecessor: Mạc Thái Tổ
- Successor: Mạc Hiến Tông
- Born: ?
- Died: 25 January 1540 (aged 39–40)
Names
- Mạc Đăng Doanh (莫登瀛)
Era dates
- Đại Chính (大正)
Posthumous name
- Emperor Văn (文皇帝)
Temple name
- Thái Tông (太宗)
- House: Mạc dynasty
- Father: Mạc Thái Tổ
- Mother: Nguyễn Thị Ngọc Toàn

Mạc Thái Tông (莫太宗, ? – 25 January 1540), known also by his given name Mạc Đăng Doanh (莫登瀛), was the second emperor of the Mạc dynasty of Vietnam from 1530 to 1540. His father, Mạc Thái Tổ, was still alive during the first year of his reign and also reigning as “senior emperor” (Thái thượng hoàng). His posthumous name is Văn hoàng đế (文皇帝), and his era name is Đại Chính.

== History ==
Mạc Đăng Doanh was born in Cao Đôi village, Bình Hà district (present-day Nam Tan, Nam Sách District, Hải Dương Province). There was no record of his birthdate. His father was Mac Dang Dung, and his mother was Nguyễn Thị Ngọc Toàn. He was the oldest son of Mac Dang Dung. After Mac Dang Dung seized the throne from Emperor Lê Chiêu Tông and established the Mạc dynasty in 1527, he made his oldest son crown prince. Mac Dang Doanh died on 25 January 1540 after reigning for 10 years. His full posthumous name is Thái Tông Khâm triết Văn hoàng đế.

Preceded by Mạc Đăng Dung	Emperor of Vietnam; 1530–1540	Succeeded by Mạc Hiến Tông
