= Mạc Tuyên Tông =

Mạc Tuyên Tông 莫宣宗
- Emperor of Đại Việt
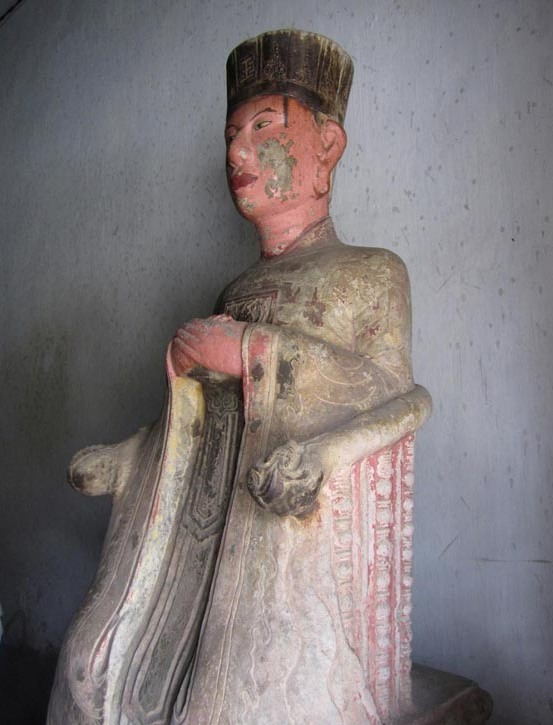

Emperor of Mạc Dynasty
- Reign: 1546–1561
- Predecessor: Mạc Hiến Tông
- Successor: Mạc Mậu Hợp
- Born: ?
- Died: 1561
Names
- Mạc Phúc Nguyên (莫福源)
Era dates
- Vĩnh Định (永定): 1547; Cảnh Lịch (景歷): 1548–1553; Quang Bảo (光寶): 1554–1561
Posthumous name
- Anh Nghị Hoàng đế (英毅皇帝); Duệ Hoàng đế (睿皇帝)
Temple name
- Tuyên Tông (宣宗)
- House: Mạc dynasty

Mạc Phúc Nguyên (chữ Hán: 莫福源, ? – December 1561), also known as Mạc Tuyên Tông (莫宣宗), was an emperor of Vietnam's Mạc dynasty who reigned from 1546 to 1561.

== Biography ==
In July 1557, Mạc Phúc Nguyên ordered his general Mạc Kính Điển to attack rebels in Thanh Hóa Province, but the attack failed and following a rearguard attack on Sơn Tây, Tuyên Quang, Hưng Hoá, Kinh Băc, and Hải Dương provinces Mạc Phúc Nguyên had to fall back to his capital at Đông Đô. He died of smallpox four years later.

He was preceded by Mạc Hiến Tông and succeeded by Mạc Mậu Hợp.

== Bibliography ==
- Đại Việt Thông Sử, Lê Quý Đôn (1759)

| Preceded by Mạc Hiến Tông | Emperor of Vietnam; 1546–1561 | Succeeded by Mạc Mậu Hợp |
