= Mạc Kính Cung =

Mạc Kính Cung 莫敬恭
- Emperor of Đại Việt

Emperor of Mạc Dynasty
- Reign: 1592–1625
- Predecessor: Mạc Kính Chỉ
- Successor: Mạc Kính Khoan
- Born: ?
- Died: 1625
Names
- Mạc Kính Cung (莫敬恭)
Era dates
- Càn Thống (乾統)
- House: Mạc dynasty
- Father: Mạc Kính Điển

Mạc Kính Cung (莫敬恭, ?–1593) was the eighth emperor of the Mạc dynasty. He reigned from 1592–1625.

He was the seventh son of Mạc Kính Điển. The emperor Mạc Kính Chỉ was captured by Trịnh lord in 1593, he was enthroned by Mạc Ngọc Liễn in Lạng Sơn. In the next year, he was defeated by Hoàng Đình Ái and fled to Longzhou, China.

Cung came back to Vietnam occupied Cao Bằng in 1596. He was attacked by Trịnh lord, and sought aid for Ming China. Trịnh lord had to recognized his dominant position in Cao Bằng under the pressure of Ming China.

In 1600, Bùi Thị, the mother of Mạc Mậu Hợp, rebelled in Thang Long and summoned him. Trịnh Tùng recaptured Thang Long and executed Bùi Thị, then defeated Cung in Hải Dương. Cung fled back to Cao Bằng.

In 1625, Trịnh Kiều (son of Trịnh Tráng) attacked Cao Bằng and captured him. He was executed in Thang Long.

Preceded by Mạc Kính Chỉ	Emperor of Vietnam; 1592–1625	Succeeded by Mạc Kính Khoan
