= Chinese era name =

Name given to a year in East Asian cultures

- Traditional Chinese: 年號
- Simplified Chinese: 年号
- Hanyu Pinyin: niánhào
- Literal meaning: year name
Transcriptions
Standard Mandarin
- Hanyu Pinyin: niánhào
Yue: Cantonese
- Yale Romanization: nìhn houh
- Jyutping: nin4 hou6

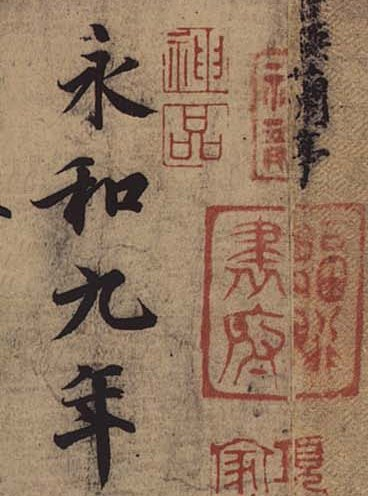
The famous Lantingji Xu written by Wang Xizhi begins with the sentence "In the ninth year of the Yonghe era, at the onset of late spring..." (永和九年, 歲在癸丑, 暮春之初). Yonghe (永和) was the era name used by Emperor Mu of Jin from AD 345 to 356.

Chinese era names, also known as reign mottos, were titles used by various Chinese dynasties and regimes in Imperial China for the purpose of year identification and numbering. The first monarch to adopt era names was the Emperor Wu of Han in 140 BCE, or more formally in 110 BCE. This system remained the official method of year identification and numbering until the establishment of the Republic of China in 1912 CE, when the era name system was superseded by the Republic of China calendar. Other polities in the Sinosphere—Korea, Vietnam and Japan—also adopted the concept of era name as a result of Chinese politico-cultural influence.

== Description ==
Chinese era names were titles adopted for the purpose of identifying and numbering years in Imperial China. Era names originated as mottos or slogans chosen by the reigning monarch and usually reflected the political, economic and/or social landscapes at the time. For instance, the first era name proclaimed by the Emperor Wu of Han, Jianyuan (建元; lit. "establishing the origin"), was reflective of its status as the first era name. Similarly, the era name Jianzhongjingguo (建中靖國; lit. "establishing a moderate and peaceful country") used by the Emperor Huizong of Song was indicative of Huizong's idealism towards moderating the rivalry among the conservative and progressive factions regarding political and social reforms.

The process of declaring an era name was referred to in traditional Chinese historical texts as jiànyuán (建元). Proclaiming a new era name to replace an existing era name was known as gǎiyuán (改元; lit. "change the origin"). Instituting a new era name would reset the numbering of the year back to year one, known as yuán nián (元年; lit. "year of origin"). On the first day of the Chinese calendar, the numbering of the year would increase by one. To name a year using an era name only requires counting years from the first year of the era. For example, 609 CE was the fifth year of Daye (大業; lit. "great endeavour"), as the era began in 605 CE; traditional Chinese sources would therefore refer to 609 CE as Dàyè wǔ nián (大業五年).

The numbering of the year would still increase on the first day of the Chinese calendar each year, regardless of the month in which the era name was adopted. For example, as the Emperor Daizong of Tang replaced the era name Yongtai (永泰; lit. "perpetual peace") with Dali (大曆; lit. "great era") in the eleventh month of the Chinese calendar in 766 CE, the first year of Dali thus only consisted of the last two months of that particular year; the second year of Dali began on the first day of the Chinese calendar the following year, just two months after its initiation.

When a new monarch ascended to the throne, he could either declare a new era immediately or inherit the usage of the existing era name from his predecessor. For example, the era name Wutai (武泰; lit. "exalted martial") of the Emperor Xiaoming of Northern Wei was immediately replaced with Jianyi (建義; lit. "establishing justice") when the Emperor Xiaozhuang of Northern Wei took the throne. On the other hand, the era name Tianxian (天顯; lit. "heavenly intent") was originally proclaimed by the Emperor Taizu of Liao but its usage was continued by the Emperor Taizong of Liao upon assuming the throne.

There were numerous era names that saw repeated use throughout Chinese history. For instance, the era name Taiping (太平; lit. "great peace") was used on at least ten occasions in China. In such cases, Chinese sources would often affix the name of the dynasty or the ruler before the era name for the purpose of disambiguation. For example, when referencing the year 410 CE, Chinese sources could either render it as Běi Yān Tàipíng èr nián (北燕太平二年; lit. "second year of Taiping of the Northern Yan") or Běi Yān Wénchéng Dì Tàipíng èr nián (北燕文成帝太平二年; lit. "second year of Taiping of the Emperor Wencheng of Northern Yan).

Most Chinese era names consisted of two Chinese characters, even though era names with three, four and six characters also existed. Shijianguo (始建國; lit. "the beginning of establishing a country") of the Xin dynasty, Tiancewansui (天冊萬歲; lit. "Heaven-conferred longevity") of the Wu Zhou, and Tiancilishengguoqing (天賜禮盛國慶; lit. "Heaven-bestowed ritualistic richness, nationally celebrated") of the Western Xia are examples of Chinese era names that bore more than two characters.

Era names were symbols of political orthodoxy and legitimacy. Hence, most Chinese monarchs would proclaim a new era upon the founding of a new dynasty. Rebel leaders who sought to establish independence and legitimacy also declared their own era names. Often, vassal states and tributary states of Imperial China would officially adopt the era name of the reigning Chinese monarch as a sign of subordination—a practice known as fèng zhēng shuò (奉正朔; lit. "following the first month of the year and the first day of the month"). For example, Korean regimes such as Silla, Goryeo, and Joseon at various times formally adopted the era names of the Tang, Wu Zhou, Later Liang, Later Tang, Later Jin, Later Han, Later Zhou, Northern Song, Liao, Jin, Yuan, Northern Yuan, Ming, and Qing dynasties of China for both domestic and diplomatic purposes.

== History ==
The Emperor Wu of Han is conventionally regarded as the first ruler to declare an era name. Prior to the introduction of the first era name in 140 BCE, Chinese monarchs utilized the Qianyuan (前元), Zhongyuan (中元) and Houyuan (後元) systems to identify and number years. However, the Feng Shan sacrifice performed by Emperor Wu at Mount Tai in 110 BCE is also regarded as the formal establishment of era names in Chinese history, and Emperor Wu used it to proclaim a new era called yuanfeng (元封). Emperor Wu also introduced another era name when he established the 'Great Beginning' (太初 Taichu) calendar in 104 BCE, and while Western Han emperors thereafter had era names changed every four years, Eastern Han emperors observed no set interval and named them after auspicious events.

Prior to the Ming dynasty, it was common for Chinese sovereigns to change the era name during their reigns, resulting in the use of more than one era name for one ruler. For instance, Emperor Xuan of Han used a total of seven era names during his reign.

The Hongwu Emperor started the tradition of having only one era name for one monarch—known as the yí shì yì yuán zhì (一世一元制; lit. "one-era-name-for-a-reign system"). Thus, modern historians would frequently refer to monarchs of the Ming and Qing dynasties by their respective era name. Notable exceptions to this "one-era-name" tradition included Zhu Qizhen who proclaimed two era names for his two separate reigns, Hong Taiji who used two era names to reflect his position as khan of the Later Jin and later as emperor of the Qing dynasty, as well as Puyi who adopted three era names in his capacity as emperor of the Qing dynasty and subsequently as ruler of Manchukuo.

With the establishment of the Republic of China in 1912 CE, the Chinese era name system was superseded by the Republic of China calendar which remains in official use in Taiwan, Penghu, Kinmen, and Matsu Islands. The Republic of China calendar, while not an era name, is based on the era name system of Imperial China. Numerous attempts to reinstate monarchical rule in China had resulted in the declaration of additional era names after the founding of the Republic, but these regimes and their associated era names were short-lived.

In 1949, the People's Republic of China was founded and the era was changed to the Common Era, for both internal and external affairs in mainland China. This notation was extended to Hong Kong in 1997 and Macau in 1999 (de facto extended in 1966) through Annex III of Hong Kong Basic Law and Macau Basic Law, thus eliminating the ROC calendar in these areas.

The concept of era name also saw its adoption by neighboring Korea and Vietnam since the middle of the 6th century CE, and by Japan since the middle of the 7th century CE. Notably, Japan still officially retains the use of era names today.

== See also ==
- Chinese calendar
- Chinese sovereign
- List of Chinese era names
- Regnal year
- Republic of China calendar
- Derivative systems in Sinosphere:
  - Japanese era name
  - Korean era name
  - Vietnamese era name
- Temple name
- Posthumous name
- Regnal name
