= Mạc Kính Vũ =

Mạc Minh Tông 莫明宗
- Emperor of Annam

Emperor of Mạc Dynasty
- Reign: 1623–1638
- Predecessor: Mạc Quang Tổ
- Successor: Mạc Kính Hẻ
- Born: ? Cao Bình canton
- Died: ? Guangxi province
- Burial: Guangxi
Names
- Mạc Kính Vũ (莫敬宇)
Era dates
- Thuận Đức (順德)
Posthumous name
- Trang Thiên Huệ Địa Cảnh Văn Di Võ Khai emperor
Temple name
- Minh Tông (明宗)
- House: Mạc Dynasty
- Father: Mạc Quang Tổ
- Mother: ?

Mạc Kính Vũ (莫敬宇, ?–?) was the tenth emperor of the Mạc dynasty. He reigned from 1638 – 1677.

He ascended the throne in 1638. He was a supporter of Wu Sangui. After the Revolt of the Three Feudatories was pacificated, he was attacked by Trịnh lord, and fled to Qing China. He was no longer supported by Qing China, and died there in exile.

Preceded by Mạc Kính Khoan	Emperor of Vietnam; 1638–1677	Succeeded by Mạc Kính Hẻ
