= Mạc Mậu Hợp =

Mạc Anh Tổ 莫英祖
- Emperor of Đại Việt
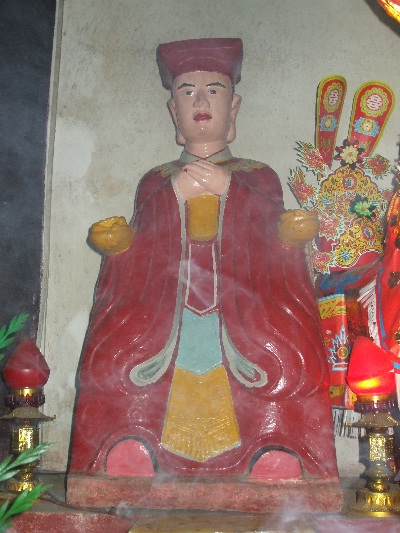
- Portrait statue.

Emperor of Mạc Dynasty
- Reign: 1562–1593
- Predecessor: Mạc Tuyên Tông
- Successor: Mạc Cảnh Tông
- Born: 1560; Đông Đô, An Nam
- Died: December 1593 (aged 32–33); Đông Đô, An Nam
- Burial: Bạch Đa pagoda, Dương Kinh county, Haiphong city
- Issue: Mạc Toàn
Names
- Mạc Mậu Hợp (莫茂洽)
Era dates
- Thuần Phúc (淳福, 1562–1565); Sùng Khang (崇康, 1566–1577); Diên Thành (延成, 1578–1585); Đoan Thái (端泰, 1586–1587); Hưng Trị (興治, 1588–1590); Hồng Ninh (洪寧, 1591–1592)
Posthumous name
- Tĩnh emperor (靜皇帝)
Temple name
- Anh Tổ (英祖); Mục Tông (穆宗)
- House: Mạc Dynasty
- Father: Mạc Tuyên Tông
- Mother: ?

Mạc Mậu Hợp (莫茂洽, 1560–1593) was the fifth and effectively last reigning emperor of the Mạc dynasty from 1562 to 1593.

== Biography ==
Mạc Mậu Hợp was born in 1560 at Đông Đô. He became the emperor in 1562.

In 1592, the Southern dynasty's forces under lord Trịnh Tùng conquered the capital Đông Đô along with the rest of the Northern provinces. Mạc Mậu Hợp was captured during the retreat at one pagoda of Phượng Nhỡn district (Lạng Giang prefecture) and was cut to pieces over three days at Thảo Tân margin (Đông Đô).

However, his son Mạc Toàn and other successors continued to hold Cao Bình county during 1592–3.

Firstly, his temple name was named as Mục Tông (穆宗) then changed as Anh Tổ (英祖) by duke Mạc Kính Cung.

== Family ==
- Father : Mạc Tuyên Tông
- Mother : A concubine of his father
- Wives : Võ Thị Hoành (武氏橫, ?–1592), Nguyễn Thị (阮氏, ?–1600)
- Children : First son has noname, second son Mạc Toàn

Preceded by Mạc Tuyên Tông	Emperor of Vietnam; 1562–1592	Succeeded by Mạc Toàn
