= Mạc Hiến Tông =

Mạc Hiến Tông 莫憲宗
- Emperor of Đại Việt

Emperor of the Mạc dynasty
- Reign: 1540–1546
- Predecessor: Mạc Thái Tông
- Successor: Mạc Tuyên Tông
- Born: ?
- Died: 1546
Names
- Mạc Phúc Hải (莫福海)
Era dates
- Quang Hòa (廣和)
Posthumous name
- Hiển hoàng đế (顯皇帝)
Temple name
- Hiến Tông (憲宗)
- House: Mạc dynasty

Mạc Hiến Tông (莫憲宗, ?–1546), birth name Mạc Phúc Hải (莫福海), was the third emperor of the Mạc dynasty of Annam from 1540 to 1546. He was born in Cao Đôi village, Bình Hà district (present day Nam Tan, Nam Sach, Hai Duong). He was the oldest son of emperor Mac Thai Tong and grandson of Mac Dang Dung.

== Sources ==
- Đại Việt Thông Sử, Lê Quý Đôn (1759)

Preceded by Mạc Đăng Dung	Emperor of Vietnam; 1530–1540	Succeeded by Mạc Tuyên Tông
