= Mạc Kính Khoan =

Mạc Kính Khoan 莫敬寬
- Emperor of Đại Việt

Emperor of Mạc Dynasty
- Reign: 1623–1638
- Predecessor: Mạc Kính Cung
- Successor: Mạc Kính Vũ
- Born: ?
- Died: 1638
Names
- Mạc Kính Khoan (莫敬寬)
Era dates
- Long Thái (隆泰)
- House: Mạc dynasty

Mạc Kính Khoan (莫敬寬, ?–1638) was the ninth emperor of the Mạc dynasty. He reigned in 1623–1638.

He was a grandson of Mạc Kính Điển. In 1623, he rebelled against the Trịnh lord in Thái Nguyên and enthroned himself. He was defeated by Trịnh Tráng and fled to Cao Bằng. In 1625, Trịnh Kiều (son of Trịnh Tráng) attacked Cao Bằng and captured Mạc Kính Cung. Khoan fled to Ming China and sent surrender documents to the Trịnh lord. He was forgiven by the Trịnh lord and allowed to come back to Cao Bằng. He was granted the titles thái úy (太尉) and Thông quốc công (通國公) by the Lê dynasty. He was a descendant of the Mạc royal family, which had ruled Vietnam from 1527 to 1592.

After the Mạc dynasty lost the capital Thăng Long (Hanoi) to the Lê–Trịnh forces, the remaining Mạc rulers retreated to the northern border region of Cao Bằng.

Preceded by Mạc Kính Cung	Emperor of Vietnam; 1623–1638	Succeeded by Mạc Kính Vũ
