= Temple name =

Posthumous titles for Sinosphere monarchs

Chinese name
- Traditional Chinese: 廟號
- Simplified Chinese: 庙号
Transcriptions
Standard Mandarin
- Hanyu Pinyin: miào hào
Yue: Cantonese
- Jyutping: miu2hou3
- IPA: [mǐːuhōu]
Southern Min
- Hokkien POJ: biō-hō

Vietnamese name
- Vietnamese alphabet: miếu hiệu
- Chữ Hán: 廟號

Korean name
- Hangul: 묘호
- Hanja: 廟號
Transcriptions
- Revised Romanization: myoho
- McCune–Reischauer: myoho

Temple names are posthumous titles accorded to monarchs of the Sinosphere for the purpose of ancestor worship. The practice of honoring monarchs with temple names began during the Shang dynasty in China and had since been adopted by other dynastic regimes in the Sinosphere, with the notable exception of Japan. Temple names should not be confused with era names (年號), regnal names (尊號) or posthumous names (謚號).

Modern academia usually refers to the following rulers by their temple names: Chinese monarchs from the Tang to the Yuan dynasties, Korean rulers of the Goryeo (until AD 1274) and Joseon dynasties, and Vietnamese rulers of the Lý, Trần, and Later Lê dynasties (with the Hồ and Later Trần dynasties as exceptions).

Numerous individuals who did not rule as monarch during their lifetime were posthumously elevated to the position of monarch by their descendants and honored with temple names. For example, Cao Cao was posthumously honored as an emperor and given the temple name Taizu by Cao Pi of the Cao Wei dynasty. Meanwhile, several individuals who were initially assigned temple names had their titles revoked, as was the case for Emperor Huan, whose temple name, Weizong, was abolished by Emperor Xian of the Eastern Han dynasty. In other cases, numerous individuals were honored with more than one temple name by intentional changes or being accorded different titles by different individuals. For instance, the Yongle Emperor of the Ming dynasty was originally honored as Taizong by the Hongxi Emperor, but his temple name was later amended to Chengzu by the Jiajing Emperor. There were also instances of individuals ruling as the sovereign of a particular realm but being accorded a temple name by another realm, as was the case for Möngke of the Mongol Empire, who was later honored as Xianzong by Emperor Shizu of the Yuan dynasty.

== Etymology ==
The "temple" in "temple name" (廟號) refers to the grand temples (太廟) built by each dynasty for the purpose of ancestor worship. The temple name of each monarch was recorded on their respective ancestral tablet placed within the grand temple.

== Structure ==
Most temple names consist of two Chinese characters, unlike the more elaborate posthumous names. In extremely rare cases, temple names could consist of three characters.

The first character is an adjective, chosen to reflect the circumstances of the monarch's reign. The vocabulary may overlap with that of the posthumous names' adjectives; however, for one sovereign, the temple name's adjective character usually does not repeat as one of the many adjective characters in his posthumous name.

The last character is either "祖" or "宗":

- 祖 (zǔ; "progenitor"): typically used for founders, either of a dynasty or a new line within an existing one. Temple names bearing this character were also accorded to monarchs with great accomplishments. The equivalent in Korean is jo (조), and tổ in Vietnamese.
- 宗 (zōng; "ancestor"): used for all other monarchs. It is rendered as jong (종) in Korean, and tông in Vietnamese.

== History ==
Temple names trace their origins to the Xia and Shang dynasties of China. In earlier times, temple names were exclusively assigned to competent rulers after their death, and were known as "day names" (日名).

The temple name system established during the Shang period utilized only four adjectives:

- 太 (tài; "grand"): honored to dynastic founders;
- 高 (gāo; "high"): honored to monarchs with great achievements;
- 世 (shì; "eternal"): honored to rulers deemed worthy of eternal remembrance; and
- 中 (zhōng; "resurgent"): honored to sovereigns who revitalized their realm following a period of decline.

Chinese monarchs of the Zhou dynasty were given posthumous names but not temple names. During the Qin dynasty, the practices both of assigning temple names and posthumous names was abandoned. The Han dynasty reintroduced both titles, although temple names were assigned sporadically and remained more exclusive than posthumous names. It was also during the Han era that other adjectives aside from the four listed above began appearing in temple names. Numerous Han emperors had their temple names removed by Emperor Xian of Han, Liu Xie, in AD 190.

Initially, in deciding whether a monarch should be honored as "祖" (zǔ; "progenitor") or "宗" (zōng; "ancestor"), a principle was strictly adhered to: "祖" was to be given to accomplished rulers while "宗" was to be assigned to virtuous rulers. However, this principle was effectively abandoned during the Sixteen Kingdoms era with the ubiquitous usage of "祖" by various non-Han regimes.

Temple names became widespread from the Tang dynasty onwards. Apart from the final ruler of a dynasty, monarchs who died prematurely, or monarchs who were deposed, most Chinese monarchs were given temple names by their descendants.

The practice of honoring rulers with temple names had since been adopted by other dynastic regimes within the East Asian cultural sphere, including those based on the Korean Peninsula and in Vietnam. Japan, while having adopted both posthumous names and era names from China, did not assign temple names to its monarchs.

== See also ==
- List of Chinese monarchs
- List of monarchs of Korea
- List of monarchs of Vietnam
- Regnal name
- Chinese era name
- List of Chinese era names
- Japanese era name
- Korean era name
- Vietnamese era name
- Posthumous name
