= Đại Nam thực lục =

Official records kept by the Nguyễn dynasty of Vietnam, spanning 1844 to 1909

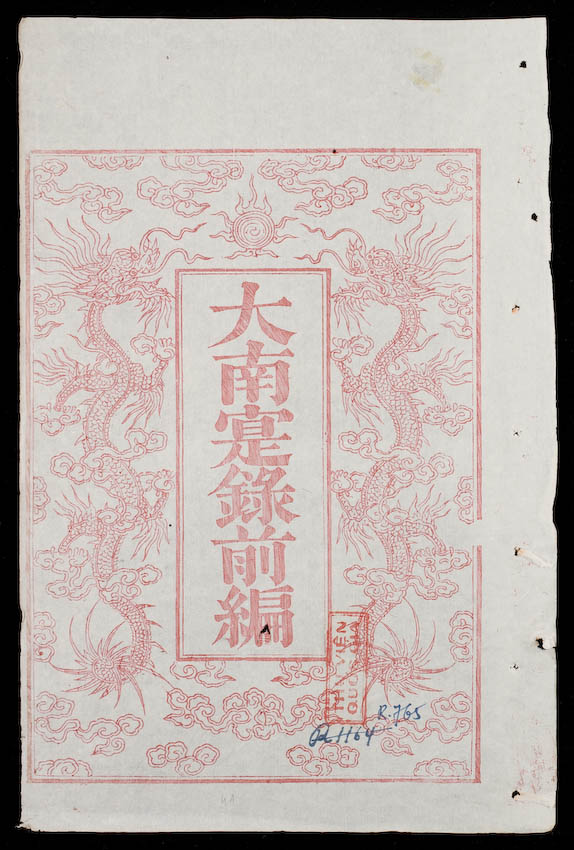
- Cover of Đại Nam thực lục tiền biên
- Author: Quốc sử quán of Nguyễn dynasty
- Original title: 大南寔錄
- Language: Classical Chinese
- Subject: History of Vietnam
- Genre: Historiography
- Publisher: Nguyễn dynasty
- Publication date: 1844–1909
- Publication place: Đại Nam

Đại Nam thực lục (chữ Hán: 大南寔錄, lit. 'Veritable Records of the Great South' or 'Annals of Đại Nam' or 'Chronicle of Greater Vietnam') was the official history of Nguyễn dynasty, Vietnam. It contained the royal records of the Nguyễn lords, and the imperial annals of Nguyễn dynasty emperors up until Khải Định, covering the period in Vietnamese history between 1545 and 1909. Just like other official histories, Đại Nam thực lục was written in Classical Chinese. The annals comprised 584 volumes.

At first the records were called "Đại Nam thật lục" "大南實錄". During Thiệu Trị's reign however, "實" was changed to "寔", and its pronunciation changed to "thực", because "實" was against the naming taboo of Empress Tá Thiên, Thiệu Trị's mother.

Đại Nam thực lục was the most important primary source regarding the Nguyễn dynasty. It was an important reference of Cao Xuân Dục's Quốc triều chính biên toát yếu and Trần Trọng Kim's Việt Nam sử lược.

== History of compilation ==
Gia Long began the project soon after he was crowned emperor. However, many records had been scattered and lost during Tây Sơn Wars. In 1811, he gave an order to collect historical records.

The compilation process was carried out during Minh Mạng's reign. The Quốc sử quán was established in 1821 to write royal historical records. Nguyễn Văn Nhơn was appointed the chief editor, while Trịnh Hoài Đức served as his deputy. The draft was completed in 1824.

In 1830, an envoy was dispatched to Qing China. The envoy had a secret mission- to obtain manuscripts of Ming Shilu from China. It is estimated that the Vietnamese obtained the manuscript in 1833. Then, Minh Mạng ordered the draft to be rewritten following the writing style of Ming Shilu. The new version was completed and handed over to the emperor in 1835. Still, Minh Mạng was still unsatisfied with its quality; he would personally edit the text later.

As a form of political censorship, the emperors often became directly involved in the work's compilation. This custom was abolished after Tự Đức's death.

== Contents ==
Đại Nam thực lục was composed of two parts: Đại Nam thực lục tiền biên (大南寔錄前編, Prequel Records) Đại Nam thực lục chính biên (大南寔錄正編, Principal Records). The former were records of the Nguyễn lords while the latter were records of the Nguyễn emperors. Sometimes Đại Nam liệt truyện tiền biên (大南列傳前編, Prequel biographies) and Đại Nam chính biên liệt truyện (大南正編列傳, Principal biographies) were regarded as parts of Đại Nam thực lục.

=== Đại Nam thực lục tiền biên ===
Đại Nam thực lục tiền biên was published in 1844.

Contents of the Đại Nam thực lục tiền biên
| Volume No. (Quyển) | Rulers | Period |
|---|---|---|
| 1 | Thái Tổ Gia Dụ Hoàng đế (Nguyễn Hoàng) | 1558–1613 |
| 2 | Hy Tông Hiếu Văn Hoàng đế (Nguyễn Phúc Nguyên) | 1613–1635 |
| 3 | Thần Tông Hiếu Chiêu hoàng đế (Nguyễn Phúc Lan) | 1635–1648 |
| 4 | Thái Tông Hiếu Triết Hoàng đế, thượng (Nguyễn Phúc Tần, first record) | 1648–1662 |
| 5 | Thái Tông Hiếu Triết Hoàng đế, hạ (Nguyễn Phúc Tần, second record) | 1663–1687 |
| 6 | Anh Tông Hiếu Nghĩa hoàng đế (Nguyễn Phúc Thái) | 1687–1691 |
| 7 | Hiển Tông Hiếu Minh Hoàng đế, thượng (Nguyễn Phúc Chu, first record) | 1691–1706 |
| 8 | Hiển Tông Hiếu Minh Hoàng đế, hạ (Nguyễn Phúc Chu, second record) | 1707–1725 |
| 9 | Túc Tông Hiếu Ninh hoàng đế (Nguyễn Phúc Chú) | 1725–1738 |
| 10 | Thế Tông Hiếu Vũ Hoàng đế (Nguyễn Phúc Khoát) | 1738–1765 |
| 11 | Duệ Tông Hiếu Định Hoàng đế, thượng (Nguyễn Phúc Thuần, first record) | 1765–1774 |
| 12 | Duệ Tông Hiếu Định Hoàng đế, hạ (Nguyễn Phúc Thuần, second record) | 1775–1777 |

=== Đại Nam thực lục chính biên ===
Contents of the Đại Nam thực lục chính biên
| Annals No. (kỷ) | Rulers | Period | comprise volumes (quyển) | Published | Notes |
|---|---|---|---|---|---|
| 1 | Gia Long | 1778–1819 | 60 | 1847 | as Nguyễn lord: vol. 1–17 as emperor: vol. 18–60 |
| 2 | Minh Mạng | 1820–1840 | 220 | 1861 | |
| 3 | Thiệu Trị | 1841–1847 | 74 | 1877 | |
| 4 | Tự Đức | 1847–1883 | 70 | 1894 | supplement annals of the deposed emperor Hiệp Hòa was appended at the end of vol.70. |
| 5 | Kiến Phúc | 1883–1885 | 8 | 1900 | annals of Kiến Phúc: vol. 1–4. supplement annals of the deposed emperor Hàm Nghi (vol.5–8) were appended at the end of annals of Kiến Phúc |
| 6 | Đồng Khánh | 1885–1888 | 11 | 1909 | |
| 6 (supplement annals) | Thành Thái & Duy Tân | 1889–1916 | 29 | not published (completed in 1935) | Both were deposed emperor so did not have annal number. annals of Thành Thái: vol. 1–19; annals of Duy Tân: vol. 20–29 |
| 7 | Khải Định | 1916–1925 | 10 | not published (completed in 1935) | |

=== Đại Nam liệt truyện tiền biên ===
Đại Nam liệt truyện tiền biên was published in 1852.

Contents of the Đại Nam liệt truyện tiền biên
| Volume No. (quyển) | Biographies of | Notes |
|---|---|---|
| 1 | consorts | consorts of Nguyễn lords |
| 2 | princes & princesses | sons and daughters of Nguyễn lords |
| 3–6 | ministers | ministers of Nguyễn lords |
| 6 | ministers, recluses, eminent monks, rebels, evil ministers | |

=== Đại Nam chính biên liệt truyện ===
Đại Nam chính biên liệt truyện contained two collections. The first collection (sơ tập, 初集) was published in 1889; the second collection (nhị tập, 二集) was published in 1895.

Contents of the Đại Nam chính biên liệt truyện sơ tập
| Volume No. (quyển) | Biographies of | Notes |
|---|---|---|
| 1 | consorts | consorts of Nguyễn Phúc Luân and Gia Long |
| 2 | princes | sons of Nguyễn Phúc Luân and Gia Long |
| 3 | princesses | daughters of Nguyễn Phúc Luân and Gia Long |
| 4–28 | ministers | ministers during Gia Long's reign vol. 28 were biographies of foreigners, including Hà Hỉ Văn (Hé Xǐwén, a Chinese pirate), Nguyễn Văn Tồn (a Cambodian), Hà Công Thái (a Degar), Bá Đa Lộc (Pierre Pigneau de Behaine, a French priest) and Vinh Ma Ly (Vinhly Malu, a Siamese pirate of Malay lineage) |
| 29 | justice upholders, females | |
| 30 | Fake Tây | rulers of Tây Sơn dynasty. Using "Fake Tây" to highlight the supposed illegitimacy. |
| 31–33 | foreign countries | vol. 31: Cao Man (Cambodia); vol. 32: Xiêm La (Siam), Thủy Xá - Hỏa Xá (Jarai Kingdoms); vol. 33: Miến Điện (Myanmar), Nam Chưởng (Kingdom of Luang Phrabang), Chiêm Thành (Champa), Vạn Tượng (Kingdom of Vientiane) |

Contents of the Đại Nam chính biên liệt truyện nhị tập
| Volume No. (quyển) | Biographies of | Notes |
|---|---|---|
| 1–4 | consorts | consorts of Minh Mạng, Thiệu Trị and Tự Đức |
| 5–8 | princes | sons of Minh Mạng and Thiệu Trị |
| 9–10 | princesses | daughters of Gia Long (only one), Minh Mạng and Thiệu Trị |
| 11–39 | ministers | people who served as ministers from 1820 to 1888 |
| 40–41 | righteous men | |
| 42 | justice upholders | |
| 43 | recluses, eminent monks | |
| 44 | women martyrs | |
| 45–46 | rebels | vol.45: Lê Văn Khôi vol.46: Nông Văn Vân, Cao Bá Quát |

== Transmission and modern publication ==
Đại Nam thực lục was kept secretly in the royal palace. Only few people could read the text. Besides the woodblock version, there were also several manuscript versions. During the French colonial period, Đại Nam thực lục was republished several times by order of the colonial government.

In 1933, a Japanese scholar, Matsumoto Nobuhiro (松本 信廣), invited George Cœdès to act as an intermediary, and successfully obtained the first six annals of Đại Nam thực lục and liệt truyện from Nguyễn royal palace. When he returned to Japan in 1935, he handed the texts over to the Tokyo Imperial University (now the University of Tokyo), Kyoto Imperial University (now Kyoto University), Tōhō Bunka Gakuin, Tōyō Bunko and Keio University. The Keio University published the annals in 1961.

Annals No. 6 (supplement annals) and No. 7 were completed in 1935; however, they were not published. After WWII, the drafts were finished in Ngô Đình Nhu's official residence. It was not clear who held the drafts after the 1963 South Vietnamese coup. Supposedly, the Vietnamese government came into possession of the drafts and still holds them in the present day.

Đại Nam thực lục was published in the Vietnamese alphabet in the 1960s. The complete version was published in the Vietnamese alphabet in the early 21st century.

== Digitization ==
Đại Nam thực lục tiền biên (vol. 1–2, vol. 3–6, vol. 7–9, vol. 10–12) and part of Đại Nam chính biên liệt truyện sơ tập (vol. 1–3, vol. 4–7, vol. 8–11, vol. 12–15, vol. 16–20, vol. 21–23, vol. 24–29, vol. 30) were digitized by the National Library of Vietnam.

Part of Đại Nam thực lục chính biên Annal No. 4 (vol. 25–29, vol. 66–70) and part of Đại Nam chính biên liệt truyện sơ tập (vol. 32–33) were digitized by Temple University.

Đại Nam liệt truyện tiền biên (vol. 1–2, vol. 3–4, vol. 5–6) was digitized by Bibliothèque nationale de France.
