= Battle of the Gianh River (1643) =

1643 naval battle

- Part of Trịnh–Nguyễn War
Date	7 July 1643
Location	Gianh River, Ba Đồn, Gulf of Tonkin 17°35′25″N 106°42′10″E
Result	Nguyễn victory

Belligerents
Dutch East India Company	Nguyễn domain of Đàng Trong

Commanders and leaders
Pieter Baeck †; Jan Erntsen †	Nguyễn Phúc Tần

Strength
3 ships	50–60 junks

Casualties and losses
100 dead, 7 captured and 2 ships sunk	7 junks sunk or damaged, 800 dead
- Location in Modern-day Vietnam

The Battle of the Gianh River was a naval clash between the Dutch East India Company (VOC) navy and the Vietnamese Nguyen navy that took place off the coast of Gulf of Tonkin, at the mouth of the Gianh River. The Dutch fleet was in coordination with the northern lord Trịnh Tráng to assault the Nguyens in the south, but a Nguyen fleet commanded by prince Nguyễn Phúc Tần pursued the Dutch fleet and engaged them on the Gianh River, resulting in a Nguyen victory.

== Background ==
The Dutch East India Company (VOC) had conflicted with Nguyen-ruled Cochinchina (southern Dai Viet) since 1641 because of their alliance with the Trinh lords in the north, who were fighting in a civil war against their rivals, the Nguyen clan in the south. As the two domains' war raged, lord Trịnh Tráng welcomed the VOC arrival in northern Dai Viet in 1637, while the Nguyens were hostile to the Dutch but allied with the Dutch's main rival, the Portuguese. In 1639, Trịnh Tráng sent his envoys to van Diemen's VOC base in Batavia, seeking to establish a military alliance with the Company in exchange for Dutch trading privileges in his Tonkin domain. In the same year, he also sent letter to the Dutch governor of Formosa, Van der Burch, to assist his military campaign against the formidable Nguyen. Finally, as tensions mounted between the Nguyen domain and the company (the Nguyen jailed several Dutch representatives and sailors), the VOC headquarters in Batavia agreed to ally with the Trinh lords and began to get involved in the war. In late May 1642, five VOC warships with 222 men led by Jan van Linga raided the central Vietnam coast possessed by the Nguyen domain, burned houses, and seized civilians as hostages before heading north to join with the Trinh army. At the Chàm Island off the coast of Quảng Nam, the VOC fleet was repulsed, with ten casualties and its captain Jacob van Liesvelt killed. The Nguyen lords then finally released all Dutch captives in the next year. 50 Dutch prisoners, along with captain Joris Welten, were allowed to sail back to Java on 19 May 1643 on a junk, but two days later a Portuguese warship attacked the junk, killing 32 Dutchmen. 14 were able to survive, and only one made it back to Batavia.^{1}

In January 1643, five VOC warships with 290 soldiers and sailors from Formosa, led by general Johannes Lamotius, arrived at Tonkin, expected to join with the Trinh army to attack Cochinchina later that year. However, after five days, the Dutch withdrew and left one ship to support the Trinh after acknowledging that the lord was not eager to launch the campaign during the spring season. In the summer, Batavia sent three warships, Wijdenes, Waterhond and Vos, led by captain Pieter Baeck, to the Gianh River to join with the Trinh forces. The Trinh army, consisting of 10,000 men and a large fleet (commanded by Trịnh Tráng's son Trịnh Tạc and assisted by Issak Davids) in Hà Tĩnh, readied to attack the Nguyen once the VOC fleet arrived.^{2}

== Course of battle ==
As the VOC galleons sailed around the Central Vietnamese coast, the Nguyen lord's son-prince Nguyễn Phúc Tần dispatched 50 to 60 smaller junks to pursue the VOC warships and battled with them five miles south of the gateway of the Gianh River. The Nguyen fleet consisted of small junks that were only capable of short-distance coastal sailing, compared to ocean-going Dutch galleons. A fierce battle was engaged: the Dutch opened fire at the Nguyen fleet and sank seven of them. The Nguyen then shot back at the Dutch galleons. One Nguyen bullet hit the arsenal of the Wijdenes, igniting its gunpowder in a huge explosion that blasted the ship apart, and Baeck was killed. The two other VOC warships were damaged and forced to flee to the Gulf of Tonkin. The Trinh army was stationed very near the battle, and could hear intense gunfire, but did not come to help the VOC fleet. Jan van Elseracq, in a letter to the Trinh lords, claimed that the Dutch warships were victors, having inflicted 800 casualties on the Nguyen and sunk seven Nguyen junks.^{3}

== Aftermath ==
The Trinh lords, disappointed at the unexpected allied naval losses, aborted the campaign. The Dutch then made a brief blockade of Hoi An in 1644 and tried to pressure the Nguyen lord to release 14 Dutch prisoners. By 1651 the VOC finally achieved peace with lord Nguyễn Phúc Tần, and stopping any further military alliance with the Trinh lords. The Trinh regime fell into internal strife as two frustrated brothers of Trịnh Tạc fought against him in a succession conflict that turned into bloody mobs through the streets of Hanoi in 1645 after the military withdrawal of the Dutch.

== See also ==
- Cambodian–Dutch War
- Sino-Dutch conflicts
- Battle of Liaoluo Bay
- Trịnh–Nguyễn War
- Siege of Fort Zeelandia

== Notes ==
1. Verclaringh van den corporael Juriaen de Rooden aengaende de cru eliteijt bij de Macaose Portugeesen aen de 50 Nederlanders bij den coningh van Quinam gelargeert gepleeght.
2. VOC 1149, Getranslateerden brieff van den Toncquinsen coninq aen den gouverneur generael
3. Missive van Van Elseracq [in Nagasaki] aen den grootmachtigen coninck van Annam, Chotsingh (Trịnh Tráng).

== Bibliography ==
- Buch, W. J. M. (1936), La Compagnie des Indes Néerlandaises et l'Indochine, BEFEO
- Emmer, Pieter C.; Gommans, Jos J. L. (2020). The Dutch Overseas Empire, 1600-1800. Cambridge University Press. ISBN 978-1-10842-837-8.
- Gunn, Geoffrey C. (2017). World Trade Systems of the East and West: Nagasaki and the Asian Bullion Trade Networks. Brill. ISBN 978-9-00435-856-0.
- Lamb, Alastair (1970). The Mandarin Road to Old Hué: Narratives of Anglo-Vietnamese Diplomacy from the 17th Century to the Eve of the French Conquest. Archon Books. ISBN 978-02080-1-036-0.
- MacLeod, N. (1927). De Oost indische Compagnie als Zeemogendheid in Azië, II. Rijswijk: Blankwaardt & Schoonhoven.
- dePlas, C. C. Van (1955). Tonkin 1644/45. Journaal Van De Reis Van Anthonio Van Brouckhorst. Amsterdam Koninklijk Instituut voor de Tropen.
- Taylor, K. W. (2013). A History of the Vietnamese. Cambridge University Press.
- Vu, Hong Lien (2018), "The Age of the Sea Falcons: Naval Warfare in Vietnam, 1771–1802", in Charney, Michael; Wellen, Kathryn (eds.), Warring Societies of Pre-colonial Southeast Asia: Local Cultures of Conflict Within a Regional Context, NIAS Press, pp. 101–128, ISBN 978-8-77694-229-8
- Zottoli, Brian A. (2011), Reconceptualizing Southern Vietnamese History from the 15th to 18th Centuries: Competition along the Coasts from Guangdong to Cambodia, University of Michigan
