= Artillery of the Nguyễn lords =

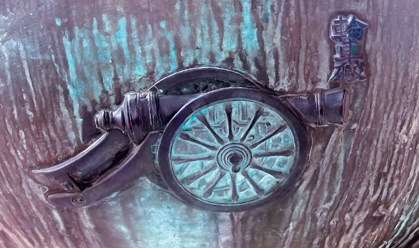
Wheeled cannon. Nhân Cauldron, Huế, 1836

The artillery of the Nguyễn lords, the family that ruled southern Vietnam from the late 16th to the late 18th centuries, and the precursor of the Nguyễn dynasty, was an important component of their military success in repelling attacks from the rival Trịnh lords, their northern contemporaries. Between 1627 and 1672, seven campaigns were waged by the Trịnh in an attempt to break the Nguyễn, without success, along a front line near the 17th parallel, which later divided North and South Vietnam, from 1954 to 1975. The Nguyễn were much weaker than the Trịnh in terms of having an established state and administration, with a vastly smaller army and population from which to draw resources, but their fortification system and their superior artillery allowed them to repel attacks from a stronger enemy while at the same time pushing southwards in the Nam tiến ("southward march") which established Vietnam's modern-day territory.

== Background ==
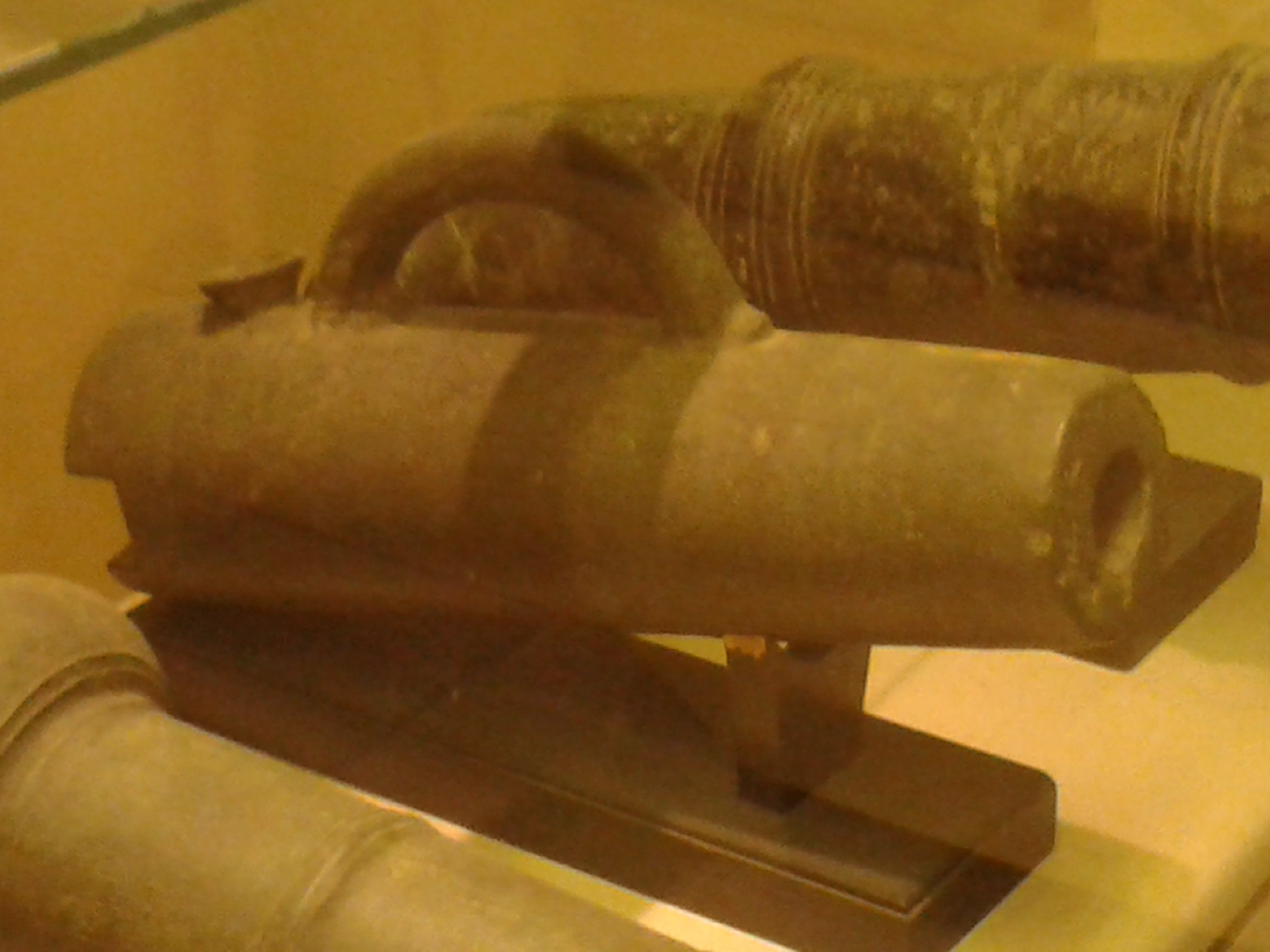
17th century Vietnamese breech block. Hanoi Museum of National History.

Artillery had been known in Vietnam since at least the 14th century. In the late 14th century, as the Trần dynasty was at its weakest point prior to the Chinese invasion by the Ming dynasty in 1407, Vietnam had been frequently troubled by incursions by the kingdom of Champa, which was located in modern-day central Vietnam. The latest incursion was led by Chế Bồng Nga, widely regarded as Champa's greatest king; he was killed by a gunshot in 1390. The Ming Shi (History of Ming) went as far as to claim that the Chinese learned the method of construction of "divine cannon" from the Vietnamese after they invaded Đại Ngu (the then name of Vietnam) in 1407, although the historian Li Tana interpreted this as referring to a particular model of weapon, since Kublai Khan had used cannons in his invasion of Japan, and because cannons built in the 1370s were unearthed in northern China.

A later instance of cannon use came in 1593 after the split between the Nguyễn and Trịnh Lords. The families had been rival forces in the imperial service of the Lê dynasty that was established after Lê Lợi expelled the Chinese and ended the Ming occupation in 1428. By the start of the 16th century, the power of the Lê family had evaporated and a series of Lê kings were enthroned and dethroned by the Trịnh family, who held de facto power. Further, Mạc Đăng Dung of the Mac family usurped the throne, and Trịnh and the Nguyễn fell out, leading to a three way power struggle. In 1558, the leader of the Nguyễn clan, Nguyễn Hoàng, whose sister was the consort of Trịnh Kiểm, persuaded Kiem to send him to reclaim Thuận Hóa territory (modern-day Huế) from a Mạc garrison force. Kiem agreed to send Hoang and his clansmen to Thuận Hóa.

During this time, Hoang still proclaimed his loyalty to the Lê dynasty and the Trịnh Lords, and sent the annual taxes back to the imperial capital. In 1593 he led his army to the north to help the Le force and the current Trịnh lord Trịnh Tùng end the decades long campaign against the Mạc. The court records assert that the Mạc's fortifications were quickly crushed when Nguyễn Hoàng employed "large cannons of all types" in battle. Asian history scholar Keith Taylor wrote of the Lê dynasty annals' portrayal of Hoang's cannon: "There is an air of the exotic and the marvelous in the northern annals' perception of Nguyễn Hoàng's arrival. He bursts with amazing wealth and a wonderful engine of war into a scene straitened by poverty and powerful enemies."

In 1620, the Nguyễn lords formally broke with the Trịnh, after Hoang's son and successor Nguyễn Phúc Nguyên refused to continue the annual paying of taxes to the capital, leading to a period of tension culminating in the Trịnh–Nguyễn War.

== Origins ==
Perhaps the major source of the Nguyễn army's firearms was Portuguese traders, who allied with the Nguyễn clan, while their Dutch rivals formed an alliance with the Trịnh lords. At the time, Chinese traders had difficulty obtaining artillery, so scholars pinpointed Macau, then an important Portuguese trading port, as the most likely source of the cannons.

In his diary, the Vietnamese-speaking Jesuit priest Christoforo Borri, a Catholic missionary in Vietnam in the 1620s, asserted an unconventional hypothesis to explain the Nguyễn cannons. He claimed that the Nguyễn Lords acquired their first artillery through luck, after a wrecked ship had run aground. He claimed that Nguyễn Phúc Nguyên's decision to flout the authority of the Trịnh was prompted by the fortuitous acquisition of the cannon, writing that his defiance was caused by being "suddenly furnished with divers pieces of artillery recovered and gotten out of the ship-wreck of sundry ships of the Portugals and Hollanders." Perhaps the new weaponry that Nguyễn lord acquired was far superior to Trịnh's archaic cannons. Borri went on to remark that he felt that the Nguyễn Lords' army had honed their cannon-operating skills to the extent that "they surpass our Europeans."

== Production and usage ==
The artillery was the centerpiece of the Nguyễn defense against the Trịnh onslaught from the very start. According to Tien Bien, the court annals of the Nguyễn, the first of the Nguyễn's two famous large defensive fortifications in modern Quảng Bình Province, known as the Luy Nhat Le, was heavily lined with artillery. According to the annals, cannons were placed at four metre intervals along the 12 km wall, with a large battery at every twelve to twenty metres. The annals went on to note that "ammunition was so abundant that the depots were like mountains." This would have meant that there were 3,000 cannons along the wall.

However, the Dutch traveller Johan van Linga cast doubt on this claim by the Nguyễn annals, estimating in his 1642 writings that the Nguyễn possessed approximately 200 cannons. Nevertheless, despite the uncertain number of cannons in the Nguyễn arsenal, historians have long credited the Nguyễn artillery as one of the key reasons that they were able to defeat an army many times larger.

The Nguyễn were also able to cast their own European-type cannons, which is another explanation for their superiority in artillery. The time at which the Nguyễn developed their own production facilities has remained a point of academic dispute. Early 20th century French-language scholars such as Le Thanh Khoi, Charles Maybon and Leopold Cadiere presumed that a Portuguese man by the name of Joao da Cruz had started a foundry in 1615. In 1972, however, Pierre-Yve Manguin cast doubt on this by noting that the Nguyễn sent 3,000 kg of copper to Macau in 1651 to cast into cannons, reasoning that it would be illogical to do so if they had access to a foundry on their own territory. Manguin instead dated da Cruz' arrival in Vietnam to 1658. In another account, the Tien Bien recorded that in 1631, a cannon foundry existed in a quarter of Huế known as Phuong Duc, where da Cruz was later reported to have worked.

By the time da Cruz died in 1682, the Nguyễn had produced most of their artillery, followed Portuguese models.

In 1750, the French merchant Pierre Poivre reported that the Nguyễn were in possession of 1,200 cannons, long after the Trịnh had given up on conquering the Nguyễn. Despite their non-use, the artillery was well known and widely associated with the Nguyễn, with the cannons being universally noted in written accounts by European travellers of the time.

By this time, however, the Nguyễn artillery had become rather obsolete. Poivre was scathing in his assessment of the effectiveness of the weapons, writing that the Nguyễn "take no notice, or are unaware, of what could make this artillery useful. None of the cannons has got six shots to fire and most of the cannonballs are not of the right caliber."

In the 1770s, the rule of the Nguyễn Lords came to an end with the uprising of the Tây Sơn dynasty. As the Nguyễn were toppled, it was reported that none of their cannons were used in an attempt to quell the uprising. This led the historian Anthony Reid to opine that the Nguyễn had begun to view their artillery only for decorative purposes, as was the case in other Southeast Asian countries, as "more a means of boosting morale and expressing the supernatural power of the state than of destroying the enemy". Ironically, their adversary, the Tây Sơn army was heavily armed with firearms of all sorts, from primitive hand cannon called "hỏa hổ" (fire tiger) to flintlock and field guns.

== Gallery ==
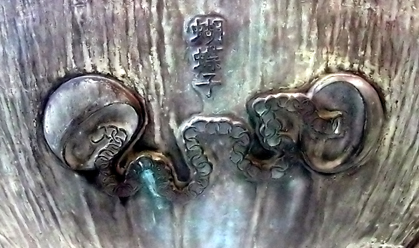
Chained ball. Anh Cauldron, Huế 1836

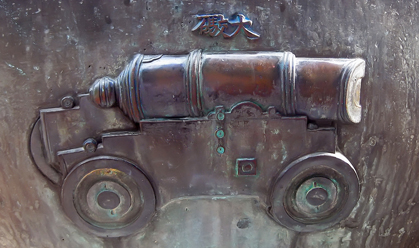
Heavy Bombard. Cao Cauldron, Huế 1836
