= Cochinchina (disambiguation) =

Cochinchina may refer to:

- Cochinchina, a historical name used in the West for the southern part of Vietnam, referring either to the area of Danang, or to Đàng Trong, or more generally to the territory ruled by the Nguyễn lords
- French Cochinchina, the southernmost part of French Indochina
