= Nguyễn Phúc Ngọc Vạn =

- Queen Consort of Cambodia
- Born: Đàng Trong, Đại Việt
- Burial: Cambodia
- Spouse: King Chey Chettha II
- Father: Nguyễn Phúc Nguyên
- Mother: Mạc Thị Giai

Nguyễn Phúc Ngọc Vạn (Chữ Hán: 阮福玉萬, 1605–1656) was queen consort of Cambodia.

She was the daughter of Nguyễn Phúc Nguyên and the chief queen of king Chey Chettha II.

She is blamed by Cambodian sources for having pressed the king to give Saigon to the emperor of Vietnam and for the growing Vietnamese influence in Cambodia.

She was instrumental in overthrowing the unpopular king Ramadhipati I by summoning Vietnamese troops to support her stepsons.
