= Thuận Hóa =

Historic territory of Vietnam

Thuận Hóa (順化, IPA: [tʰwə̂nˀ hwǎː]) was a historic territory in central Vietnam. It consisted of the modern provinces of Quảng Trị, Huế (historically, Thừa Thiên–Thuận Hóa), Da Nang, and northern Quảng Nam.

In 1306, the king of Champa, Chế Mân, offered Vietnam two Cham prefectures, Ô (Cham: "Vuyar") and Lý (Cham:" Ulik"), in exchange for a marriage with the Vietnamese princess Huyền Trân. The Vietnamese emperor Trần Anh Tông accepted this offer, then took and renamed Ô prefecture and Lý prefecture as Thuận prefecture (順州, Thuận Châu) and Hóa prefecture (化州, Hóa Châu). These prefectures soon began to be referred to collectively as the Thuận Hóa region. From this time, Thuận Hóa was a territory where the Vietnamese, Chăms, and Lao frequently fought one another. In 1466, during the reign of emperor Lê Thánh Tông, Thuận Hóa became one of the 12 prefectures of Vietnam and later became a province of Vietnam.

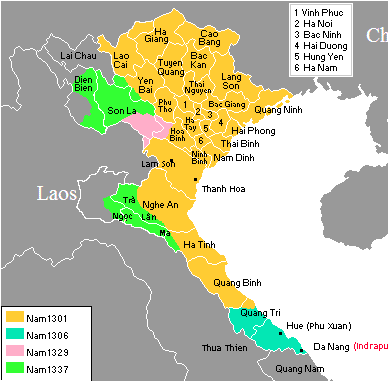
Thuận Hóa province in southernmost part of the Vietnamese map in 1306. Now Quảng Trị, Huế and Danang.

The Mạc dynasty usurped the throne of the Lê family to create the Northern Court, whereupon descendant of the Lê emperors was enthroned as de jure Southern court rulers by Nguyễn Kim. Shortly afterward, Nguyễn Kim, the leader of the Lê dynasty loyalists and the de facto ruler of Vietnam, was poisoned by a Mạc dynasty general. Kim's son-in-law, Trịnh Kiểm, took over the leadership and assassinated Kim's eldest son, Nguyễn Uông, in order to secure his authority. Nguyễn Hoàng, another son of Nguyễn Kim, feared having a fate like his brother Nguyễn Uông so he pretended to have mental illness and asked his sister Ngoc Bao, who was a wife of Trịnh Kiểm, to entreat Kiểm to allow Hoàng to govern Thuận Hóa, the southernmost region of Vietnam at this time. Because Mạc dynasty loyalists were still occupying Thuận Hóa while Trịnh Kiểm was busy fending off Mạc forces in northern Vietnam during this time, Ngọc Bảo's request was approved and Nguyễn Hoàng went south. After Hoàng pacified Thuận Hóa, he and his successor Nguyễn Phúc Nguyên secretly made this region loyal to the Nguyễn family; then they rose against the Trịnh lords. Vietnam erupted into a new civil war between two de facto ruling families: the clan of the Nguyễn lords and the clan of the Trịnh lords. The Nguyễn lords continuously developed the territory and turned it into a strong base for their war against the Trịnh Lord and their expansion to the south. During this time, Thuận Hóa territory spanned from Quảng Bình to Thừa Thiên–Huế. The European people called this region with names such as Singoa, Sinoa or Senna.

After the foundation of Nguyễn dynasty, emperor Gia Long made Thuận Hóa territory a part of Vùng Kinh kỳ (Capital territory), one of three administrative divisions of Vietnam at this time.

In the 18th Century Thuận Hóa and Quảng Nam ceased producing much rice of their own and became dependent on shipments of cheaper rice from the Mekong Delta.

== 1945 ==
In mid-1945; the name of Thuận Hóa was restored by Vietnamese prime minister Trần Trọng Kim but it was quickly abandoned after the decline of the Empire of Vietnam.

== Other names ==
In the West, Thuận Hóa was also known by the Portuguese, and later French, as Sinoa, Singoa, Senna, and Sinuua - reflecting European knowledge of Chinese pronunciations of the name (Chinese 順化 Shunhua) possibly by contact with Chinese traders in Đàng Trong (Sino-Vietnamese 塘中, part of Cochinchina).
