= Nguyễn Phúc Lan =

Nguyễn Phúc Lan 阮福瀾
- Nguyễn lords Lord of Cochinchina

Nguyễn Lords
- Reign: 1635–1648
- Predecessor: Nguyễn Phúc Nguyên
- Successor: Nguyễn Phúc Tần
- Born: August 13, 1601
- Died: March 19, 1648 (aged 46); Cochinchina
- Spouse: Đoàn Thị Ngọc
- Issue: Nguyễn Phúc Vũ; Nguyễn Phúc Tần; Nguyễn Phúc Quỳnh
Names
- Nguyễn Phúc Lan (阮福瀾)
Regnal name
- Chúa Thượng (主上 "Lord Thượng")
Posthumous name
- Thừa Cơ Toản Thống Quân Minh Hùng Nghị Uy Đoán Anh Vũ Hiếu Chiêu Hoàng Đế 承基纘統剛明雄毅威斷英武孝昭皇帝
Temple name
- Thần Tông (神宗)
- House: Nguyễn Phúc
- Father: Nguyễn Phúc Nguyên
- Mother: Mạc Thị Giai
- Religion: Buddhism

Nguyễn Phúc Lan (Vietnamese: Nguyễn Phúc Lan / 阮福瀾; 13 August 1601 – 19 March 1648) was one of the Nguyễn lords who ruled south Vietnam from the city of Phú Xuân (modern-day Huế) from 1635 to 1648. During his rule the Trịnh–Nguyễn War continued.

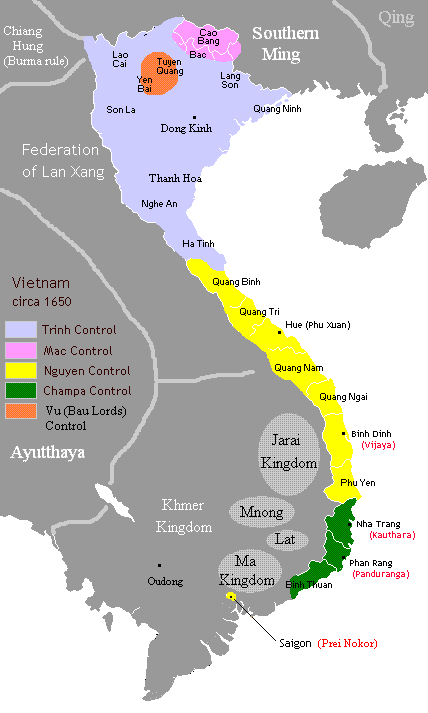
Map of Vietnam showing (roughly) the areas controlled by the Trịnh, Nguyễn, Mac, and Champa about the year 1640

Nguyễn Phúc Lan was the second son of Nguyễn Phúc Nguyên. His father died in the midst of the war by Trịnh Tráng to conquer the southern provinces. Unwilling to make peace, Nguyễn Phúc Lan continued his father's policies of maintaining a strong defensive position on the great walls while continuing friendly relations with the Portuguese and expanding south into Cambodian and Champa territory. Following after his grandfather, he took the title of Vuong (Prince/Lord), calling himself Cong-Thuong Vuong.

In 1640, famed Jesuit missionary Alexandre de Rhodes returned to Vietnam, this time to the Nguyễn court at Phú Xuân. He had been forced to leave the court at Hanoi ten years earlier but now he was back, reasoning correctly that rules against him in Hanoi did not apply in Phú Xuân. He began work on converting people to the Roman Catholic faith and building churches. However, after six years, Nguyễn Phúc Lan came to the same conclusion as Trịnh Tráng had: that de Rhodes and the Catholic Church represented a threat to his rule. De Rhodes was condemned to death but the sentence was reduced to exile on pain of death should he return. De Rhodes never returned to Vietnam but Vietnamese Catholics remained and continued to practice their new religion.

After a break of nine years, Trịnh Tráng launched a new major assault in 1642. This time they had their own European cannons, purchased from the Dutch. They also had modern Dutch ships to lead their fleet. At first the assault went well and the first of the great walls was breached. The attack was renewed in 1643 but the second wall could not be taken. At sea, once again the Nguyễn fleet defeated the Royal (Trịnh) fleet. The offensive halted and the Trịnh withdrew.

On March 19, 1648, Nguyễn Phúc Lan died and was succeeded by his son, Nguyễn Phúc Tần, who was 28 years old.

== See also ==
- Lê dynasty
- List of Vietnamese dynasties

== Sources ==
- Encyclopedia of Asian History, Volume 3 (Nguyen Lords) 1988. Charles Scribner's Sons, New York
- The Encyclopedia of Military History by R. Ernest Dupuy and Trevor N. Dupuy. Harper & Row (New York)

Vietnamese royalty
Preceded by Nguyễn Phúc Nguyên	Nguyễn lords Lord of Cochinchina; 1635–1648	Succeeded by Nguyễn Phúc Tần
