= Éléazar-François des Achards de la Baume =

Éléazar-François des Achards de la Baume, or des Achards de Ferrus (1679–1741), a native of Avignon, France, and a titular bishop of Halicarnassus, Asia Minor, passed many laborious years as a missionary in his own country; but he found many obstacles from the rivalry of different ecclesiastical orders.

His honorable adherence to the offices of piety and humanity that he discharged during the plague at Avignon in 1721, brought the attention of Pope Clement XII, who employed him as an apostolic vicar to settle the disgraceful disputes which had arisen among the missionaries in Cochinchina.

When sent to Cochinchina as a visitor apostolic, he was not more edified there than he had been in France—not only was one order opposed to another, but national rivalry set ecclesiastics of the same order against one another. The dislike of the Italian missionaries to those of France was extreme. As visitor apostolic, Éléazar endeavored to effect peace between the contending parties. "Peace!" replied father Martioli, "I would as soon make peace with the devil as with a Frenchman!" Éléazar died in Cochin before effecting any improvement to the situation, two years after his arrival.

A seminary in Huế was established by Achards. An account of his mission was published by his secretary, M. Faber, in three volumes.
