= Nguyễn Phúc Trú =

Nguyễn Phúc Trú 阮福澍
- Nguyễn lords Lord of Cochinchina

Nguyễn lords
- Reign: 1725–1738
- Predecessor: Nguyễn Phúc Chu
- Successor: Nguyễn Phúc Khoát
- Born: 14 January 1697
- Died: 7 June 1738 (aged 41); Cochinchina
- Spouse: Trương Thị Thư; Trương Thị Hoặc
- Issue: Nguyễn Phúc Khoát
Names
- Nguyễn Phúc Trú (阮福澍)
Regnal name
- Chúa Ninh (主寧 "Lord Ninh")
Posthumous name
- Tuyên Quang Thiệu Liệt Tuấn Triết Tĩnh Uyên Kinh Văn Vĩ Vũ Hiếu Ninh Hoàng Đế 宣光紹烈濬哲靜淵經文緯武孝寧皇帝
Temple name
- Túc Tông (肅宗)
- House: Nguyễn Phúc
- Father: Nguyễn Phúc Chu
- Mother: Tống Thị Được
- Religion: Buddhism

Nguyễn Phúc Trú, or Nguyễn Phúc Chú, (1697–1738; r. 1725–1738) was one of the Nguyễn lords who ruled over Đàng Trong (southern Vietnam) in the 16th–18th centuries. Also known as Ninh Vương, he expanded his family's territory by seizing the Cambodian provinces of Vĩnh Long Province and Tiền Giang Province in 1731.

Vietnamese royalty
Preceded by Nguyễn Phúc Chu	Nguyễn lords Lord of Cochinchina; 1725–1738	Succeeded by Nguyễn Phúc Khoát
