= Nguyễn Phúc Chu =

Vietnamese lord (1675–1725)

Nguyễn Phúc Chu 阮福淍
- Nguyễn lords Lord of Cochinchina

Nguyễn Lords
- Reign: 1691–1725
- Predecessor: Nguyễn Phúc Thái
- Successor: Nguyễn Phúc Trú
- Born: June 11, 1675; Cochinchina
- Died: June 2, 1725 (aged 49); Cochinchina
- Spouse: Tống Thị Được; Nguyễn Thị Lan; Trần Thị Nghi; Lê Thị Tuyên; Tống Thị Lượng
- Issue: Nguyễn Phúc Trú
Names
- Nguyễn Phúc Chu (阮福淍)
Regnal name
- Chúa Minh (主明 "Lord Minh")
Posthumous name
- Anh Mô Hùng Lược thánh Văn Tuyên Đạt Khoan Từ Nhân Thứ Hiếu Minh Hoàng Đế 英謨雄略聖文宣達寬慈仁恕孝明皇帝
Temple name
- Hiển Tông (顯宗)
- House: Nguyễn Phúc
- Father: Nguyễn Phúc Thái
- Mother: Tống Thị Lĩnh
- Religion: Buddhism

Nguyễn Phúc Chu (chữ Hán: 阮福淍, 1675 – 1 June 1725) was one of the Nguyễn lords who ruled southern Vietnam (Đàng Trong) from 1691 to 1725. During his time in power, he had to deal with a Champa rebellion and the first major war against the Cambodians. Nguyễn Phúc Chu was the eldest son of Nguyễn Phúc Trăn. He gained the throne on his father's early death, at just 15 years old. He took for himself the title Tong Quan-Cong (Duke of Tong).

Early in his reign the Champa ruler of Panduranga (in present-day Phan Rang, Ninh Thuận), Po Sot, began a rebellion against the Nguyễn. The revolt was at first unsuccessful and after the Nguyễn army put down the revolt there was an outbreak of plague in Panduranga. Three years later, a Cham aristocrat, Oknha Dat, obtained the help of General A Ban (a somewhat mysterious figure).

Together they defeated a Nguyễn military force in 1695. The new Cham king, Po Saktiray Da Patih (younger brother of Po Sot), made a treaty with Nguyễn Phúc Chu. The result was the Cham rulers in Panduranga were recognised as Trấn Vương (local lords) for the next 135 years, though they had no authority over Vietnamese living in the area. In 1714, Nguyễn Phúc Chu sent an army into Cambodia to support Keo Fa who claimed the throne against Prea Srey Thomea (see also the article on the Post-Angkor Period). The army of Siam also got involved in the war, the Siamese sided with the Prea Srey Thomea against the Vietnamese (this was during the time of the Ayutthaya Kings of Siam). The Vietnamese won several battles against the Siamese (including the battle of Banteay Meas) but shifting fortunes led to the war ending with negotiations rather than military defeat on either side.

== Last years ==
In 1720, near the end of his reign, Nguyễn Phúc Chu, took formal control over the last lands of the Champa. Whether this was a violation of the peace treaty he signed with the Cham 25 years earlier is not known. On 1 June 1725, Nguyễn Phúc Chu died and was succeeded by his second son, Nguyễn Phúc Trú.

Map of Vietnam showing the expansion of territory over 800 years

== See also ==
- Lê dynasty
- List of Vietnamese dynasties

Vietnamese royalty
Preceded by Nguyễn Phúc Thái	Nguyễn lords Lord of Cochinchina; 1691–1725	Succeeded by Nguyễn Phúc Trú
