= Nguyễn Phúc Trăn =

Nguyễn Phúc Thái 阮福溙
- Nguyễn lords Lord of Cochinchina

Nguyễn lords
- Reign: 1687–1691
- Predecessor: Nguyễn Phúc Tần
- Successor: Nguyễn Phúc Chu
- Born: January 22, 1650; Phú Xuân, Cochinchina
- Died: February 7, 1691 (aged 41); Phú Xuân, Cochinchina
- Burial: Phú Xuân, Cochinchina
- Spouse: Tống Thị Lĩnh
- Issue: Nguyễn Phúc Chu; 4 other sons and 4 daughters
Names
- Nguyễn Phước Thái (阮福溙)
Regnal name
- Chúa Nghĩa (主義 "Lord Nghĩa")
Posthumous name
- Thiệu-hư Toản-nghiệp Khoan-hồng Bác-hậu Ôn-huệ Từ-tường Hiếu-nghĩa Emperor 紹休纂業寬洪博厚溫惠慈祥孝義皇帝
Temple name
- Anh Tông (英宗)
- House: Nguyễn Phúc
- Father: Nguyễn Phúc Tần
- Mother: Tống Thị Đôi
- Religion: Three teachings

Nguyễn Phúc Thái (chữ Hán: 阮福溙, 1650–1691) was the ruler of Cochinchina from 1687 to 1691. During his short rule, a small rebellion by Ming Chinese was put down.

== Biography ==
Nguyễn Phúc Thái was also known as Nguyễn Phước Trăn, courtesy name Ngạn (彥). He was the second son of lord Nguyễn Phúc Tần. Nguyễn Phúc Thái took the title Hoằng Quốc-công (弘國公 ; National Duke of Hoằng, different from Quận-công as Local Duke). With the end of the Trịnh–Nguyễn War, not much of note happened during Nguyễn Phúc Thái's rule. It is reported that he put down an uprising by Chinese immigrants who had settled in Saigon.

In 1689, he ordered an invasion of Cambodia. However, the Vietnamese general withdrew after meeting with the Cambodian king Chei Chettha III's envoy, a beautiful woman. In 1690 Nguyễn Phúc Thái sent a more famous general, Nguyễn Hữu Hào, who also retreated after meeting the same woman, waiting for presents that never came.

On February 7, 1691, Nguyễn Phúc Thái died and was succeeded by his eldest son, Nguyễn Phúc Chu.

Map of Cochinchina showing the expansion of territory over 800 years.

Vietnamese royalty
Preceded by Nguyễn Phúc Tần	Nguyễn Lords; 1687–1691	Succeeded by Nguyễn Phúc Chu
