= Nguyễn Phúc Tần =

Nguyễn Phúc Tần 阮福瀕
- Nguyễn lords Lord of Cochinchina

Nguyễn Lords
- Reign: 1648–1687
- Predecessor: Nguyễn Phúc Lan
- Successor: Nguyễn Phúc Thái
- Born: July 18, 1620
- Died: April 30, 1687 (aged 66); Cochinchina
- Spouse: Chu Thị Viên; Tống Thị Đôi
- Issue: Nguyễn Phúc Diễn; Nguyễn Phúc Thái; Nguyễn Phúc Trân; Nguyễn Phúc Thuần
Names
- Nguyễn Phúc Tần (阮福瀕)
Regnal name
- Chúa Hiền (主賢 "Lord Hiền")
Posthumous name
- Tuyên Uy Kiến Vũ Anh Minh Trang Thánh Đức Thần Công Hiếu Triết hoàng đế 宣威建武英明莊正聖德神功孝哲皇帝
Temple name
- Thái Tông (太宗)
- House: Nguyễn Phúc
- Father: Nguyễn Phúc Lan
- Mother: Đoàn Thị Ngọc
- Religion: Buddhism

Nguyễn Phúc Tần (Vietnamese: Nguyễn Phúc Tần / 阮福瀕; 18 July 1620 – 30 April 1687) was one of the Nguyễn lords who ruled south Vietnam from the city of Phú Xuân (modern-day Huế) from 1648 to 1687. During his rule, the Trịnh–Nguyễn War came to an end. During his reign, he annexed nearly all the remaining Champa lands. Lord Phuc Lan took the title Duong Quan-Cong (Duke of Duong).

== Biography ==
Phuc Tan was the second son of Nguyễn Phúc Lan. Lan died just before Trịnh Tráng made yet another effort to conquer the southern provinces.

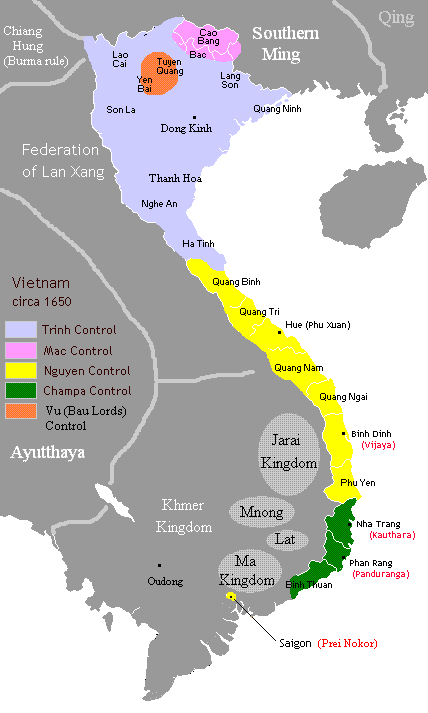
Map of Vietnam showing (roughly) the areas controlled by the Trịnh, Nguyễn, Mạc, and Champa about the year 1640

Shortly after his father's death, Trịnh Tráng launched his final offensive against the Nguyễn. But in a climactic battle, called Truong Duc, the Royal (Trịnh) army was destroyed. At the same time, the Lê Emperor (Lê Chan Tông) died, possibly as a result of being at the battle. This defeat was devastating for the Trịnh and the Nguyễn clan's generals planned to further the success and conquer the Imperial Capital.

Four years after the battle, the Nguyễn army commenced their own offensive into Trịnh territory. In 1653 they drove the Royal (Trịnh) army out of Quảng Bình Province. The next year the Nguyễn army captured Hà Tĩnh Province. The old Trịnh lord Trịnh Tráng died at this point and was succeeded by his son, the very capable Trịnh Tạc. The Nguyễn army moved into Nghệ An Province in 1655 but they were fatally weakened by a dispute between two of the Nguyễn generals. The result was that Trịnh Tạc was able to defeat the Nguyễn armies in turn and drive the Nguyễn forces back to the great walls in 1656. The Nguyễn offensive was over.

After five years of rest and refit, Trịnh Tạc staged a small offensive against the walls in 1661 but with the usual result. The walls held and the attack was halted.

For the next decade Trịnh Tạc focused on the north while Nguyễn Phúc Tần focused on the south, expanding his territory against the Champa and around Saigon.

Finally, in 1672, Trịnh Tạc made one last attempt to capture Phú Xuân (Huế) and bring the Nguyễn under control. The attacking army was under the command of Trịnh Tạc's son, Trịnh Căn, while the defending army was under the command of Nguyễn Phúc Tần's son Prince Nguyễn Phuoc Thuan. The assault failed but this time, Trịnh Tạc offered to end the war with a truce. Nguyễn Phúc Tần accepted this truce and so the long war finally came to an end. The border between the two parts of Vietnam was fixed at the Linh River. The truce held for the next 100 years.

Nguyễn Phúc Tần could now turn his full attention to the south and his army and government officials were able to solidify control over the southernmost provinces. Tensions were rising between the Vietnamese and the Cambodians, but open warfare had not yet broken out.

On April 30, 1687, Nguyễn Phúc Tần died and was succeeded by another son, Nguyễn Phúc Trăn.

== See also ==
- Lê dynasty
- List of Vietnamese dynasties

== Sources ==
- Encyclopedia of Asian History, Volume 3 ('Nguyễn Lords') 1988. Charles Scribner's Sons, New York.
- The Encyclopedia of Military History by R. Ernest Dupuy and Trevor N. Dupuy. Harper & Row (New York).

Vietnamese royalty
Preceded by Nguyễn Phúc Lan	Nguyễn lords Lord of Cochinchina; 1648–1687	Succeeded by Nguyễn Phúc Trăn
