= Veritable Records =

Historical records compiled by the dynasties of China, Korea, Japan, and Vietnam

Chinese name
- Traditional Chinese: 實錄
- Simplified Chinese: 实录
Transcriptions
Standard Mandarin
- Hanyu Pinyin: Shílù
- Wade–Giles: Shih^{2}-lu^{4}

Vietnamese name
- Vietnamese: Thực lục
- Chữ Hán: 寔錄

Korean name
- Hangul: 실록
- Hanja: 實錄
Transcriptions
- Revised Romanization: Sillok

Japanese name
- Hiragana: じつろく
- Shinjitai: 実録
Transcriptions
- Romanization: Jitsuroku

Veritable Records are historical records compiled by government (court) historians of Chinese dynasties since the 6th century, and later in Korea, Japan and Vietnam which adopted the Chinese bureaucratic system and the writing system of Classical Chinese. Typically they were compiled immediately following the death of a monarch (preparations sometimes began while he was still alive) and follow a strictly prescribed format. Veritable Records are highly detailed and contain a wealth of political, economical, military, and biographical information.

Famous examples include (all written in Classical Chinese):

- China: Ming Veritable Records (for the Ming dynasty), Qing Veritable Records (for the Qing dynasty)
- Japan: Nihon Sandai Jitsuroku (Veritable Records of Three Reigns of Japan)
- Korea: Joseon Wangjo Sillok (Veritable Records of the Joseon dynasty)
- Vietnam: Đại Nam thực lục (Veritable Records of Great Nam)

During the Yuan and Qing dynasties of China, Veritable Records were also written in Mongol and Manchu respectively.

== Origin ==
The earliest Veritable Records were those compiled under the direction of Zhou Xingsi (周興嗣, 469–521) for the reign of the Emperor Wu of Liang (r. 502–549), but the practice of writing Veritable Records did not become standardized until the reign of the Emperor Taizong of Tang (r. 626–649), who was obsessed with his historical legacy.

== Examples ==
Dynasty	Title
Tang dynasty (China)	Tang Shilu ("Veritable Records of Tang") 唐實錄
Liao dynasty (China)	Huangchao Shilu ("Veritable Records of the Imperial Dynasty") 皇朝實錄
Later Zhou (China)	Zhou Shizong Shilu ("Veritable Records of Shizong of Zhou") 周世宗實錄
Song dynasty (China)	Song Shilu ("Veritable Records of Song") 宋實錄
Jin dynasty (China)	Jin Shilu ("Veritable Records of Jin") 金實錄
Western Xia (China)	Xixia Shilu ("Veritable Records of Western Xia") 西夏實錄
Yuan dynasty (China)	Yuan Shilu ("Veritable Records of Yuan") 元實錄
Ming dynasty (China)	Ming Shilu ("Veritable Records of Ming") 明實錄
Kingdom of Tungning (China)	Xianwang Shilu ("Veritable Records of the Deceased King") 先王實錄
Qing dynasty (China)	Qing Shilu ("Veritable Records of Qing") 清實錄
Imperial House of Japan (Japan)	Shoku Nihon Kōki ("Extended Chronicle of Japan") 続日本後紀
Imperial House of Japan (Japan)	Nihon Montoku Tennō Jitsuroku ("Veritable Records of Emperor Montoku of Japan") 日本文徳天皇実録
Imperial House of Japan (Japan)	Nihon Sandai Jitsuroku ("Veritable Records of Three Reigns of Japan") 日本三代実録
Imperial House of Japan (Japan)	Shōwa Tennō Jitsuroku ("Veritable Records of Emperor Showa") 昭和天皇実録
Joseon dynasty (Korea)	Joseon Wangjo Sillok ("Veritable Records of the Joseon Dynasty") 조선왕조실록 朝鮮王朝實錄
Nguyễn dynasty (Vietnam)	Đại Nam thực lục ("Veritable Records of Great Nam") 大南寔錄

== See also ==
- Twenty-Four Histories
