= Trịnh Tráng =

Trịnh Tráng 鄭梉
- Trịnh lords Lord of Dang Ngoai
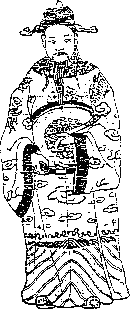

Trịnh Lords
- Reign: 1623–1657
- Predecessor: Trịnh Tùng
- Successor: Trịnh Tạc
- Born: 6 August 1577; Thanh Hóa, Vietnam
- Died: 28 May 1657 (aged 79); Đông Kinh, North Vietnam
- Spouse: Trần Thị Ngọc Đài; Nguyễn Thị Ngọc Tú; Nguyễn Phúc Ngọc Súy
- Issue: Trịnh Kiều; Trịnh Tạc more sons and daughters
Names
- Trịnh Tráng (鄭梉)
Regnal name
- Thanh Đô Vương (清都王)
Posthumous name
- Nghị Vương (誼王)
Temple name
- Văn Tổ (文祖)
- House: Trịnh lords
- Father: Trịnh Tùng
- Mother: Đặng Thị Ngọc Bảo
- Religion: Buddhism

Trịnh Tráng (chữ Hán: 鄭梉, 6 August 1577 – 28 May 1657), posthumous name: Nghị Vương (誼王), temple name: Văn Tổ (文祖) was the second lord of Trịnh ruling Dang Ngoai (known to the Europeans as Tokin) in northern Vietnam from 1623 to 1657. Being one of the famous Trịnh lords, he started the Trịnh–Nguyễn War in 1627 and launched several major offensives which failed to crush the Nguyễn lords.

== Early life ==
Trịnh Tráng was the eldest son of Trịnh Tùng. He took power after a brief succession struggle at the time of Trịnh Tùng's death. The main problem he faced during his rule was the power and independence of the Nguyễn lords who ruled the southernmost provinces of Vietnam. In modern terms the Nguyễn ruled over Thừa Thiên–Huế Province, Da Nang, Quảng Nam Province, and Quảng Ngãi Province. This was the frontier of Vietnam and, as these provinces were newly conquered from the Champa, there was new land to farm and plenty of work for ambitious men.

In 1600, the first Nguyễn Lord, Nguyễn Hoàng, refused to acknowledge the authority of the Trịnh-dominated court in Hanoi. With the death of Trịnh Tùng, the current Nguyễn Lord, Nguyễn Phúc Nguyên refused to send any taxes or soldiers to the court. After years of rising tension, Trịnh Tráng went to war against the Nguyễn.

== Accession ==
In 1623, the current lord, Trịnh Tùng fell ill and give Trịnh Tráng his position and army. His brother, Trịnh Xuân was jealous and want to be the lord. Trịnh Xuân tried to kill Trịnh Tùng with Lê Kính Tông - a current king of Lê. But they did not succeed.

On 15 July 1623, Trịnh Xuân burned the Trịnh's palace, Trịnh Tùng and his servants ran away. Trịnh Tùng sent his servants to catch and kill Trịnh Xuân. Two days later, Trịnh Tùng died while he was finding Trịnh Tráng. Trịnh Tráng heard about it and return to go into mourning his father and became Lord of Trịnh.

== War ==
Trịnh Tráng

Vietnamese name
- Vietnamese: Trịnh Tráng
- Hán-Nôm: 鄭梉

Trịnh Tráng launched many major offensives against the Nguyễn, but all of them failed. The first attack lasted four months in the summer of 1627. The next was a sea assault, it was defeated in 1633. Two more assaults were made against the Nguyễn's mighty defensive wall in 1642 and 1643. This time, with the aid of advanced Dutch cannons, one wall was breached but the other wall held firm. 1643 also marked the resignation of the king, Lê Than Tông, in favor of his son, Lê Chan Tông. In 1648 a major offensive came to grief as the Royal (Trịnh) army was defeated at the battle of Truong Duc. The young king died at this time (Some people believe it was as a result of the battle) and so his father, Lê Than Tông, took the throne for a second time.

Now the Nguyễn tried going on the offensive. In 1653, the Nguyễn army attacked north and defeated the weakened Royal army. Quảng Bình Province was captured. Then Hà Tĩnh Province fell to the Nguyễn army. In the following year, Trịnh Tráng died as Nguyen forces made attacks into Nghệ An Province.

Although he controlled a large, well-organized state, with a powerful military and advanced European cannons, Trịnh Tráng was completely unsuccessful in his attempts to conquer the smaller and weaker Nguyen territory. At the end of his life, it was the Nguyễn who were on the offensive. Trịnh Tráng's only success came against the Mac. During his rule, the royal army captured all but Cao Bằng Province from the weakened Mac rulers.

== See also ==
- Lê dynasty
- List of Vietnamese dynasties
- Trịnh–Nguyễn War

== Sources ==
- Annam and it Minor Currency Chapter 16 (downloaded May 2006)
- A Glimpse of Vietnam's History (downloaded May 2006)

Vietnamese royalty
Preceded by Trịnh Tùng	Trịnh lords Lord of Dang Ngoai; 1623–1657	Succeeded by Trịnh Tạc
