= Christoforo Borri =

Jesuit missionary in Vietnam, mathematician, and astronomer

Reverend Christoforo Borri
- Born: 1583; Milan, Duchy of Milan
- Died: May 24, 1632 (aged 48–49); Rome, Papal States
- Known for: Studies on the magnetic variation of the compass
- Scientific career
- Fields: Mathematics; Astronomy
- Institutions: Jesuit Brera College (Milan); University of Coimbra

Ecclesiastical career
- Religion: Christianity
- Church: Catholic Church
- Ordained: 16 September 1601

Christoforo Borri SJ (1583 in Milan – 24 May 1632 in Rome), also called Christopher Borrus in older English sources, was a Jesuit missionary in Vietnam, a mathematician, and an astronomer.

== In Vietnam ==
Borri's family was of good standing in Milan. He became a member of the Society of Jesus, 16 September 1601; in 1616 he was sent from Macau with the Jesuit priest Marquez, as one of the first missionaries to Đàng Trong (knowns to the Europeans as Cocincina, now part of central Vietnam). He stayed at Hội An from 1618 (or at the end of 1617) until 1622, being known under the name of Bruno.

== At Coimbra ==
After his return, Borri taught mathematics at Coimbra; in 1632, he entered the Cistercian Order, taking the name of Father Onofrio, and died the same year.

Borri's most important work Relatione della nuova missione delli P.P. della Compagnia di Gesù al Regno della Cocincina appeared in Rome in 1631 and was translated into French, Dutch, Latin, German and English. It was also inserted in Churchill's Collection of Voyages (1704), and in Sprengel and Forster's Neue Beitrage zur Volkerund Länderkunde (1793). The work was considered one of the best sources of information concerning Cochinchina on account of its detailed description of the physical, political, and ecclesiastical conditions of the country.

Borri also made observations on the magnetic variation of the compass. According to Kircher (1641) he drew up the first chart for the Atlantic and Indian Oceans showing the spots where the magnetic needle makes the same angles with the meridian; if this is true, he should be regarded as the forerunner of Edmund Halley. Borrus gives the explanation to the chart in a manuscript that belongs to the Royal Academy at Lisbon. In another manuscript, now in Évora, Tratado da arte de navegar pelo Cristovao Bruno, which bears on the same subject, he makes suggestions, according to Allatius (1633), as to a new method for determining the longitude at sea and also concerning improvements in sea-charts. Philip II of Spain, desiring to understand the Borrus' nautical studies and inventions, once summoned him from Coimbra to Madrid. He also wrote Doctrina de Tribus Coelis, Aereo, Sydereo et Empeireo, and also some accounts of his travels for the Congregatio de Propaganda Fide.

== See also ==
- List of Jesuit scientists
