= Nguyễn Phúc Nguyên =

Nguyễn Phúc Nguyên 阮福源
- Nguyễn lords Lord of Cochinchina
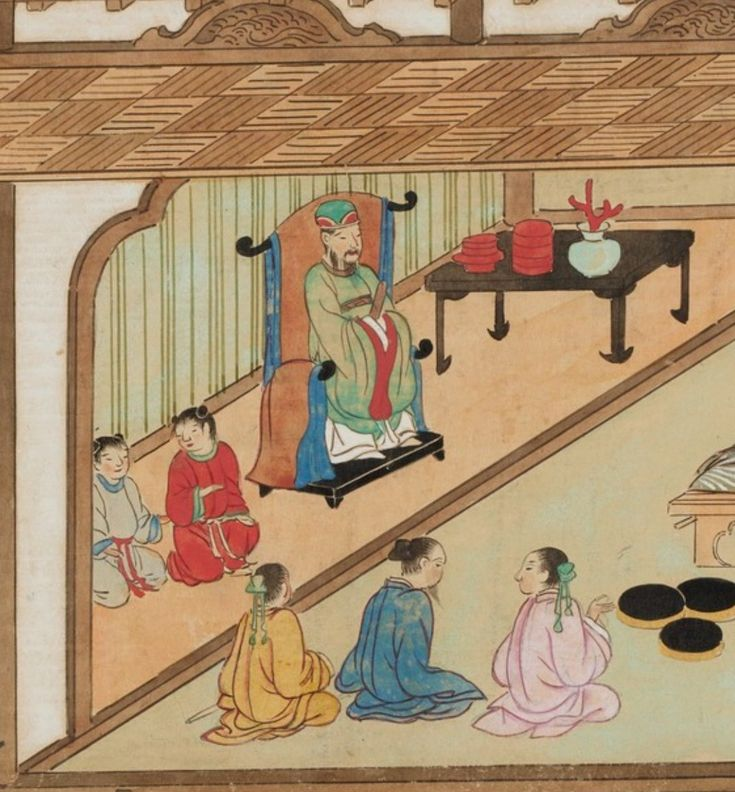
- Portrait of Nguyễn Phúc Nguyên as the governor of Quảng Nam at Hội An in Shuin-sen kochi toko zukan by Chaya Shinroku (朱印船交趾渡航図巻), a Japanese painting in 17th century.

Nguyễn Lords
- Reign: 1613–1635
- Predecessor: Nguyễn Hoàng
- Successor: Nguyễn Phúc Lan
- Born: August 16, 1563
- Died: November 19, 1635 (aged 72); Cochinchina
- Spouse: Mạc Thị Giai
- Issue: Nguyễn Phúc Kỳ; Nguyễn Phúc Lan; Nguyễn Phúc Ngọc Vạn
Names
- Nguyễn Phúc Nguyên (阮福源)
Regnal name
- Chúa Sãi (主仕 "Lord Sãi")
Posthumous name
- Hiển Mô Quang Liệt Ôn Cung Minh Duệ Dực Thiện Tuy Du Hiếu Văn Hoàng Đế 顯謨光烈溫恭明睿翼善綏猷孝文皇帝
Temple name
- Hy Tông (熙宗)
- House: Nguyễn Phúc
- Father: Nguyễn Hoàng
- Mother: Nguyễn Thị
- Religion: Buddhism

Nguyễn Phúc Nguyên (阮福源; 16 August 1563 – 19 November 1635), temple name Nguyễn Hy Tông, was the second of the Nguyễn lords, ruling all of southern Vietnam from 1613 to 1635. During his time in office, the Nguyễn lords established a settlement in what is now modern-day Saigon. Later, his refusal to pay tribute to the Trinh lord court sparked the Trịnh–Nguyễn War.

== Biography ==
Nguyễn Phúc Nguyên was the sixth son of Nguyễn Hoàng. Upon the death of his father, Nguyễn Phúc Nguyên succeeded his father as ruler of all of southern Vietnam. He continued his father's policy of refusing to submit to the authority of the court in Hanoi, dominated at this time by his cousin Trịnh Tùng. Unlike his father he did not take the title Vương (王) but instead called himself Nhơn quốc công (仁國公) which translates roughly to Duke of Nhơn.

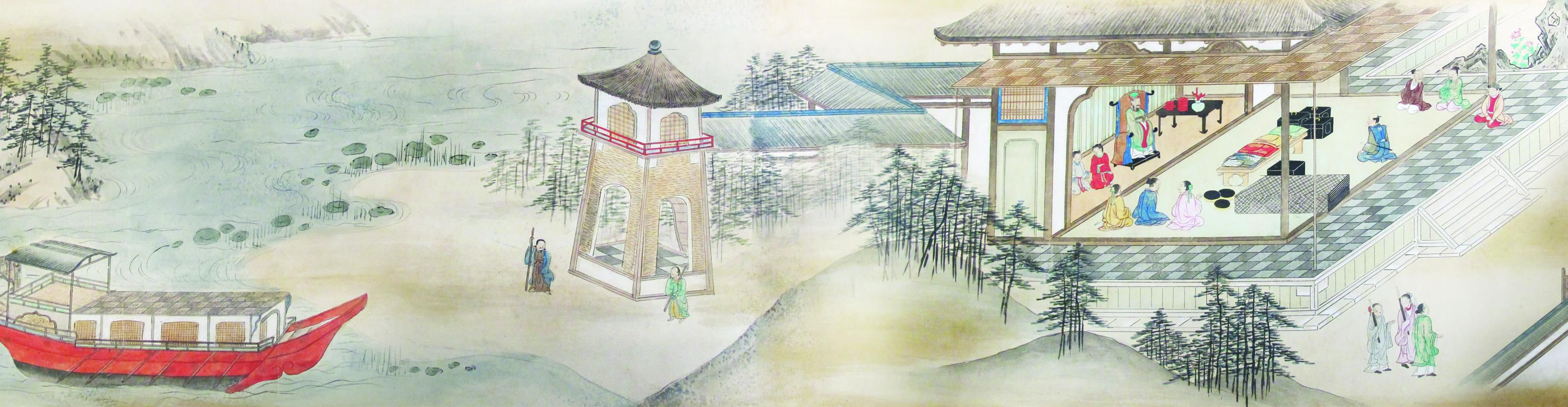
Japanese merchant Chaya Shinroku paid tribute to lord Nguyễn Phúc Nguyên (green costume) at Governor house of Quang Nam in Hội An, late 17th century

== Foreign trade ==
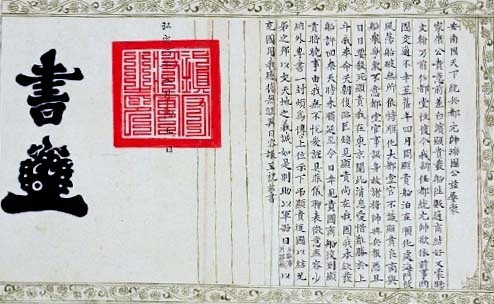
A copy of the letter of Nguyễn Phúc Nguyên sent to Tokugawa Ieyasu for diplomatic establishment

From 1615 Nguyễn Phúc Nguyên allowed Portuguese merchants to set up a trading post at Faifo (modern-day Hội An). The Nguyễn purchased advanced European cannons from the Portuguese and learned something of European ship design. This would help them enormously in later years. As time passed, Faifo became a major trade port for the south-west Pacific where traders in the region came to sell and acquire goods. Chinese, Japanese, Europeans, and South Asians all came to trade at Faifo. Originally the land of Faifo itself was not valuable, but later on the Nguyễn lords established various sugarcane and mullberry plantations to produce goods for overseas export. Traders from Japan came all the way to Vietnam because the Ming and later Manchu emperors forbade trade with Japan. In order to obtain highly desirable Chinese silks and ceramics, the Japanese too had to come to Faifo. The Japanese often bought local silks, which were high-quality and desired by the Japanese to the point that they would purchase whole batches months prior to their annual arrival. In time, Faifo's local silk prices became attuned to the whims of the Japanese market. The Nguyễn lords also imported massive quantities of Japanese coins to either melt down for their cannons or circulate as currency, as southern Vietnam lacked gold and copper and the Japanese had much to export.

== Relation with Cambodia ==
=== Vietnamese expansionism to Cambodia ===
Nguyễn Phúc Nguyên maintained friendly relations with Cambodia. Around 1620, Nguyễn Phúc Nguyên's daughter Nguyễn Phúc Ngọc Vạn married the king of Cambodia, Chey Chettha II (the marriage seems to have been contracted years earlier). As a result of this marriage, the Cambodian King allowed the Nguyễn to establish a small trading and tax post at Prei Nokor what is now Saigon in 1623. Additionally, the Nguyễn lords supplied the Cambodians with weapons for their expeditions against the Ayutthaya Kingdom. The Vietnamese settlement at Prey Nokor was the start of a major expansion by the Vietnamese beyond the southern border established by Lê Thánh Tông in 1471.

In 1631, the Italian missionary Christoforo Borri who was living in Quy Nhơn witnessed the military support of Nguyễn Phúc Nguyên to the Cambodians and recorded it as so:

Lord Nguyễn Phúc Nguyên sent his military support to his son-in-law Chey Chettha II twice to against Siamese. In 1623, the mission from Nguyễn was dispatched to Oudong, with a lot of treasures and gift to strengthen the relationship between two government and confirm the alliance of Cambodia and Nguyễn. After the negotiation, Chey Chettha II allowed to let them established the trading post which were namely Kas Krobei (Vũng Tàu) and Prei Nokor (Saigon) for taxation. Nguyễn lords can bring their private army to protect the post and their citizens as well as the public security of the city of Prei Nokor.

== Trịnh–Nguyễn wars ==
In 1623 Trịnh Tùng died and was replaced by his son Trịnh Tráng. At his behest the imperial court in Hanoi sent a formal demand to Nguyễn Phúc Nguyên to pay tribute and acknowledge the Lê emperor (and by extension, the Trịnh family) as his superiors. In 1624, Nguyễn Phúc Nguyên formally refused. Three years later, the Trịnh-led royal army marched south and attacked the Nguyễn. The first set of battles lasted for four months but the Nguyễn armies were not defeated and Phú Xuân remained in Nguyễn hands. The Trịnh army withdrew north to regroup. The Nguyễn immediately began construction of a massive pair of walls to defend their lands. This pair of walls, just south of the Linh River, eventually grew to a length of 11 miles, stretching from the sea to the mountains. The walls were each 20 feet tall and equipped with many cannons of European design.

In 1633, the Trịnh tried to outflank the walls with an amphibious invasion but the Nguyễn fleet was able to defeat the Trịnh-led royal fleet at the battle of Nhật Lệ.

== Death ==
Nguyễn Phúc Nguyên died in 1635 while his war with the Trịnh was still ongoing. Still, the defensive measures he had put in place served the Nguyễn well. Phú Xuân was not taken by the Trịnh until 1774. Further, his defensive success in these first battles was a credit to his ability to attract talented men to his cause and make use of expert military advice and technologies, even if it came from foreign countries.

Until Gia Long's era, Nguyễn Phúc Nguyên was posthumously conferred the temple name Hy Tông.

== See also ==
- Lê dynasty
- List of Vietnamese dynasties

== Sources ==
- Encyclopedia of Asian History, Volume 3 (Nguyễn Lords) 1988. Charles Scribner's Sons, New York.

Vietnamese royalty
Preceded by Nguyễn Hoàng	Nguyễn lords Lord of Cochinchina; 1613–1635	Succeeded by Nguyễn Phúc Lan
