= Đàng Ngoài =

17th and 18th century area in northern Vietnam

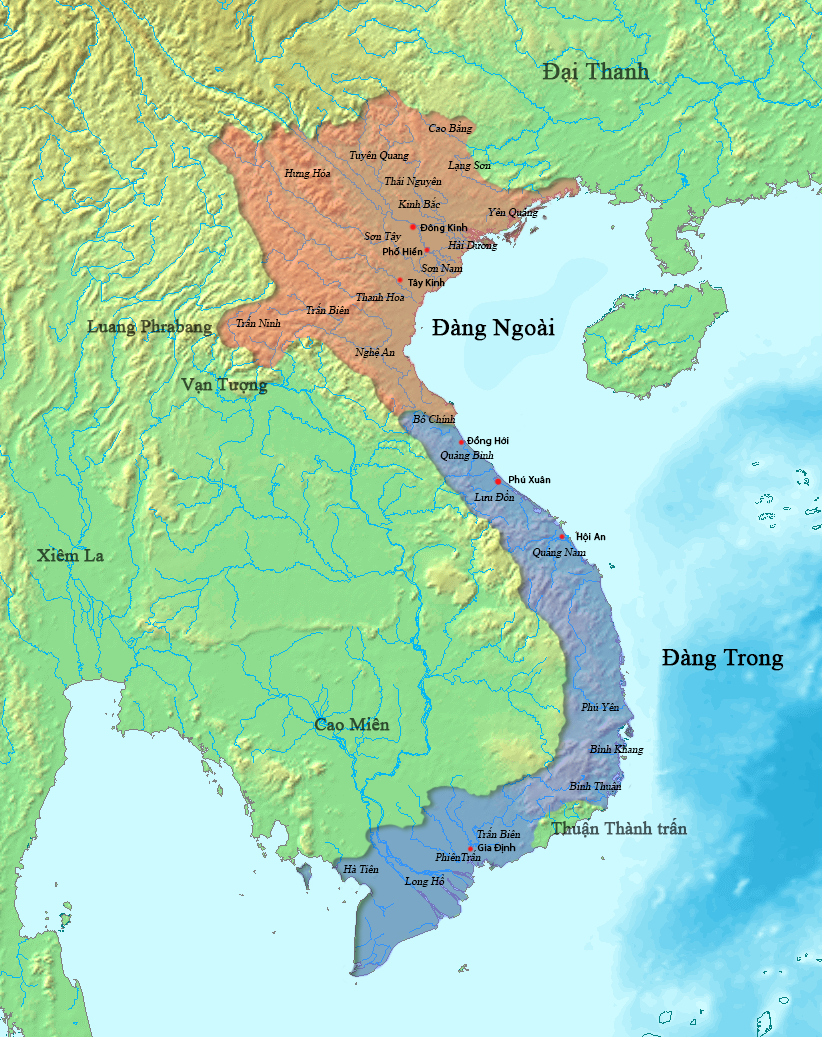
Đàng Ngoài (red) and Đàng Trong (blue) in 1757.

Đàng Ngoài (chữ Hán: 唐外, lit. "Outer Land"), also known as Bắc Hà (北河, "North of the River") or Kingdom of Annam (安南國) by foreigners, was an area in northern Đại Việt (now Vietnam) during the 17th and 18th centuries as the result of Trịnh–Nguyễn War. The name Đàng Ngoài was first recorded in the Dictionarium Annamiticum Lusitanum et Latinum by Alexandre de Rhodes.

Đàng Ngoài was de facto ruled by the Trịnh lords with the Lê emperors acting as titular rulers. The capital was Thăng Long (now Hanoi). Thăng Long was also known as Đông Kinh 東京, meaning "Eastern Capital", from which the common European name for Đàng Ngoài "Tonkin" originated. It was bordered by Đàng Trong (under the Nguyễn lords) along the Gianh River in Quảng Bình province. The names gradually fell into disuse after Nguyễn Ánh reunified Đại Việt.

== See also ==
- Đàng Trên (Mạc lords)
- Đàng Trong (Nguyễn lords)
