= Nguyễn lords =

Noble feudal clan of Vietnam, predecessor of the Nguyễn dynasty

Coordinates: 16°28′N 107°36′E

Nguyễn lords Chúa Nguyễn (chữ Hán: 主阮) Nguyễn Vương (chữ Hán: 阮王)
- 1558–1777; 1780–1802
- Heirloom seal "Đại Việt quốc Nguyễn chủ vĩnh trấn chi bảo" (大越國阮𪐴永鎮之寶, "Seal of the eternal government of the Nguyễn Lords of the state of Great(er) Viêt") (from 1709)

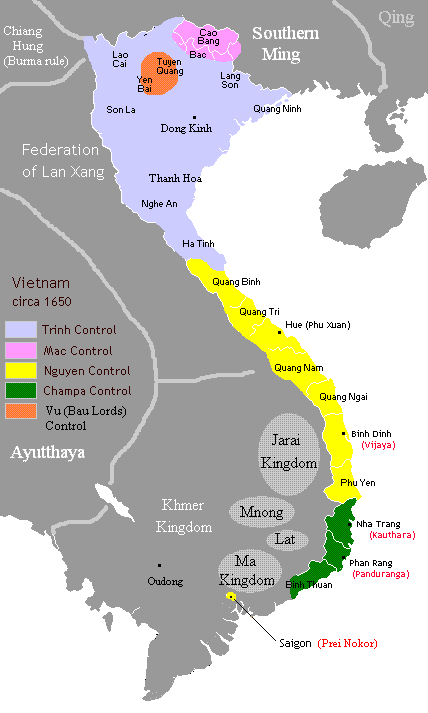
- Map of Vietnam circa 1650 Nguyễn Lê dynasty under Trịnh's control Mạc as rump state Kingdom of Champa.

- Map of Đại Việt in middle 18th century Nguyễn's domain Lê dynasty's domain under Trịnh's authority
- Status: Subordinates of Trịnh lords (1558–1627); De jure lordship (fief) within Lê dynasty of Đại Việt (1558–1777, 1780–1789); De facto independent state (1789–1802); Rump state (1775–1785); Government in exile (1785–1788)
- Capital: Ái Tử (1558–1570); Trà Bát (1570–1600); Dinh Cát (1600–1626); Phước Yên (1626–1636); Kim Long (1636–1687); Phú Xuân (1687–1712), (1738–1775); Bác Vọng (1712–1738); Quảng Nam (1775); Gia Định (1775–1777, 1780–1783, 1788–1802)
- Capital-in-exile: Bangkok (1785–1788) (Note: Nguyễn Phúc Ánh (King of Nguyễn) lost all of territory to Tây Sơn dynasty and sought refuge in Siam. In 1788, he came back to Đại Việt and gradually reclaimed most of southern provinces while Tây Sơn emperor Quang Trung was actively engaged in Sino-Vietnamese war.)
- Common languages: Vietnamese
- Religion: Neo-Confucianism, Buddhism, Taoism, Vietnamese folk religion, Catholicism
- Government: Feudal dynastic hereditary military dictatorship (1558–1775) Absolute monarchy (1789–1802)
- Dukes/Kings
  - 1558–1613: Nguyễn Hoàng (first)
  - 1738–1765: Nguyễn Phúc Khoát (as King)
  - 1780–1802: Nguyễn Phúc Ánh (last)

Population
  - 1800: 1,770,000
- Currency: Copper-alloy and zinc cash coins
Preceded by	Succeeded by
House of Nguyễn Phúc; Revival Lê dynasty	Nguyễn dynasty

The Nguyễn lords (Vietnamese: Chúa Nguyễn, chữ Hán: 主阮; 1558–1777, 1780–1802), also known as the Nguyễn clan (Vietnamese: Nguyễn thị; chữ Hán: 阮氏), were Nguyễn dynasty's forerunner and a feudal noble clan ruling southern Đại Việt in the Revival Lê dynasty. The Nguyễn lords were members of the House of Nguyễn Phúc. The territory they ruled was known contemporarily as Đàng Trong (Inner Realm) and by the exonyms the Kingdom of Cochinchina and the Kingdom of Quảng Nam (Vietnamese: Quảng Nam Quốc; chữ Hán: 廣南國), in opposition to the Trịnh lords, who ruled northern Đại Việt as Đàng Ngoài (Outer Realm), known as the "Kingdom of Tonkin" by Europeans and "Kingdom of An Nam" (Vietnamese: An Nam Quốc; chữ Hán: 安南國) by Imperial China in bilateral diplomacy. They were officially entitled, in Sino-Vietnamese, the Nguyễn Vương (chữ Hán: 阮王) in 1744 when lord Nguyễn Phúc Khoát self-proclaimed himself to elevate his status equally to Trịnh lords's title known as the Trịnh Vương (Vietnamese: Trịnh Vương; chữ Hán: 鄭王). Both Nguyễn and Trịnh clans were de jure subordinates and fief of the Lê dynasty. However, the de jure submission of the Nguyễn lords to the Trịnh lords ended in 1627 sparked the war between them.

While they recognized the authority of and claimed to be loyal subjects of the revival Lê dynasty, they were de facto rulers of southern Đại Việt. Meanwhile, the Trịnh lords ruled northern Đại Việt in the name of the Lê emperor, who was in reality a puppet ruler. They fought a series of long and bitter wars that pitted the two halves of Vietnam against each other. The Nguyễn were finally overthrown in the Tây Sơn wars, but one of their descendants would eventually come to unite all of Vietnam. Their rule consolidated earlier southward expansion into Champa and pushed southwest into Cambodia.

== Origin ==
The Nguyễn lords traced their descent from a powerful clan originally based in Thanh Hóa Province. The clan supported Lê Lợi in his successful war of independence against the Ming dynasty. From that point on, the Nguyễn were one of the major noble families in Vietnam. Perhaps the most famous Nguyễn of this time was Nguyễn Thị Anh, the queen-consort for nearly 20 years (1442–1459).

== History ==
=== Restoration of the Lê dynasty ===
In 1527, Mạc Đăng Dung overthrew the emperor Lê Cung Hoàng and established a new dynasty (Mạc dynasty). The founders of both clan Nguyễn Kim and his son-in-law Trịnh Kiểm fled to Thanh Hóa province and refused to accept the rule of the Mạc. All of the region south of the Red River was under their control, but they were unable to dislodge the Mạc from Đông Kinh (the capital of state) for many years. During this time, the Nguyễn–Trịnh alliance was led by Nguyễn Kim; his daughter Nguyễn Thị Ngọc Bảo was married to the Trịnh clan leader, Trịnh Kiểm. After several unsuccessful revolts, they went into exile in Xam Neua (Kingdom of Lan Xang) and established a government-in-exile there to reorganize armed forces to fight the Mạc dynasty.

=== Trịnh seizes power over the Lê dynasty ===
In 1533, Lê dynasty was restored and managed to recapture the southern part of country. However, the authority of Lê emperor was not fully restored as restored emperor Lê Trang Tông was installed as figurehead, while true authority lay in the hands of Nguyễn Kim. In 1543, Nguyễn Kim captured Thanh Hóa from Mạc loyalists. Dương Chấp Nhất, commander of Mạc forces in the region, decided to surrender his troops to the advancing Nguyễn forces. When Kim seized the Tây Đô citadel and was en route to attack Ninh Bình, in 20 May 1545, Dương Chấp Nhất invited Kim to visit his military camp. In the hot temperature of summer, Dương Chấp Nhất treated Kim with a watermelon. After the party, Kim felt ill after returning home and died the same day. Dương Chấp Nhất later resumed allegiance to the Mạc dynasty. The records of the Đại Việt sử ký toàn thư and Đại Nam thực lục both suggest that Dương Chấp Nhất tried to assassinate the emperor Lê Trang Tông by pretending to surrender. However, the plot was unsuccessful, and then he changed his target to Nguyễn Kim, who was in charge of the government and the military.

After the death of Kim, the imperial government was plunged into chaos. Kim's eldest son Nguyễn Uông initially took power, but he was soon secretly assassinated by his brother-in-law Trịnh Kiểm who assumed control of the government.

=== Nguyễn Hoàng as governor of Thuận Hóa and Quảng Nam province ===
Kim's second son Nguyễn Hoàng feared that he would face same fate as his brother; hence, he attempted to flee the capital to avoid further assassination aimed at him. Later, he asked his sister Nguyễn Thị Ngọc Bảo (wife of Trịnh Kiểm) to ask Kiểm to appoint him to be the governor of Đại Việt's southern frontier province of Thuận Hóa in what is modern-day Southern of Quảng Bình, Quảng Trị to Quảng Nam provinces, land that once belonged to kingdom of Champa. Back then, Thuận Hóa was still regarded as uncivilised land, and simultaneously, Trịnh Kiểm also sought to remove remaining power and influence of Nguyễn Hoàng in the capital city; so, he agreed to a deal in order to keep Nguyễn Hoàng away from capital city. In 1558, Nguyễn Hoàng and family, relatives and his loyal generals moved to Thuận Hóa to take his position. Arriving at Triệu Phong District, he made the place his new capital and constructed a new palace. In March 1568, Emperor Lê Anh Tông summoned Hoàng for a meeting at Tây Đô and met Trịnh Kiểm at his personal mansion. He arranged for the emperor to additionally appoint Hoàng governor of Quảng Nam province to keep him faithful to Kiểm to join an alliance against the Mạc dynasty in the north. In 1636, Nguyễn Hoàng moved his base to Phú Xuân (modern Huế). Nguyễn Hoàng slowly expanded his territory further south, while the Trịnh lords continued their war with the Mạc dynasty to control northern Vietnam.

=== Trịnh–Nguyễn alliance defeat of the Mạc dynasty ===
In 1592, Đông Đô (Hanoi) was recaptured by the Trịnh–Nguyễn army by lord Trịnh Tùng and the Mạc emperor Mạc Kinh Chi was executed. The remnant Mạc clan fled to Cao Bằng and would survive there until finally conquered in 1677 by the Trịnh lords (though they had surrendered the imperial dignities in 1627 to the Trịnh-controlled imperial court). The next year, Nguyễn Hoàng came north with an army and money to help defeat the remainder of the Mạc clan.

=== Rising tensions ===
In 1600, Lê Kính Tông ascended the throne. Just like the previous Lê emperors, the new emperor was a powerless figurehead under the control of Trịnh Tùng. Apart from this, a revolt broke out in Ninh Bình province, possibly instigated by the Trịnh. As a consequence of these events, Nguyễn Hoàng formally broke off relations with the court in the north, rightly arguing that it was the Trịnh who ruled, not the Lê emperor. This uneasy state of affairs continued for the next 13 years until Nguyễn Hoàng died in 1613. He had ruled the southern provinces for 55 years. His successor, Nguyễn Phúc Nguyên, continued Nguyễn Hoàng's policy of essential independence from the court in Hanoi. He initiated friendly relations with the Europeans who were now sailing into the area. A Portuguese trading post was set up in Hội An. By 1615, the Nguyễn were producing their own bronze cannons with the aid of Portuguese engineers. In 1620, the emperor was removed from power and executed by Trịnh Tùng. Nguyễn Phúc Nguyên formally announced that he would not be sending any tax to the central government nor did he acknowledge the new emperor as the emperor of the country. Tensions rose over the next seven years until open warfare broke out in 1627 with the next successor of the Trịnh, Trịnh Tráng.

The war lasted until 1673, when peace was declared. The Nguyễn not only fended off Trịnh attacks but also continued their expansion southwards along the coast, although the northern war slowed this expansion. Around 1620, Nguyễn Phúc Nguyên's daughter married Chey Chettha II, a Khmer king. Three years later, in 1623, the Nguyễn formally gained permission for Vietnamese to settle in Prey Nokor, which would later be known as the city of Saigon.

In 1673, the Nguyễn concluded a peace with the Trịnh lord Trịnh Tạc, beginning a long era of relative peace between north and south.

When the war with the Trịnh ended, the Nguyễn were able to put more resources into suppressing the Champa kingdoms and conquest of lands which used to belong to the Khmer Empire.

The Dutch brought Vietnamese slaves they captured from Nguyễn territories in Quảng Nam Province to their colony in Taiwan.

The Nguyễn lord Nguyễn Phúc Chu referred to Vietnamese as "Han people" 漢人 (Hán nhân) in 1712 when differentiating between Vietnamese and Chams. The Nguyen Lords established frontier colonies, known as đồn điền after 1790. It was said "Hán di hữu hạn" 漢夷有限 ("the Vietnamese and the barbarians must have clear borders") by Gia Long, unifying emperor of all Vietnam, when differentiating between Khmer and Vietnamese.

Nguyễn Phúc Khoát ordered Chinese-style trousers and tunics in 1774 to replace sarong-type Vietnamese clothing. He also ordered Ming, Tang, and Han-style clothing to be adopted by his military and bureaucracy. Pants were mandated by the Nguyen in 1744 and the Cheongsam Chinese clothing inspired the áo dài. The current áo dài was introduced by the Nguyễn lords. Cham provinces were seized by the Nguyễn lords. Provinces and districts originally belonging to Cambodia were taken by Võ Vương.

=== Territorial expansion wars over the south ===
The Nguyễn lords waged multiple wars against Champa in 1611, 1629, 1653, 1692, and by 1693 the Cham leadership had succumbed to the Nguyen domination. The Nguyễn lords established the protectorate of Principality of Thuận Thành to wield power over the Cham court until Minh Mạng Emperor abolished it in 1832. The Nguyễn also invaded Cambodia in 1658, 1690, 1691, 1697 and 1713. Inscription on a Nguyễn cannon manufactured by Portuguese engineer and military advisor Juan de Cruz dating from 1670 reads "for the King and grand Lord of Cochinchina, Champa and of Cambodia."

Map of Vietnam showing the conquest of the south (Nam tiến), dark green and light blue portions conquered by the Nguyễn lords

In 1714, the Nguyễn sent an army into Cambodia to support Ang Em's claim to the throne against Prea Srey Thomea. Siam sided with Prea Srey Thomea against the Vietnamese claimant. At Bantea Meas, the Vietnamese routed the Siamese armies, but by 1717 the Siamese had gained the upper hand. The war ended with a negotiated settlement, whereby Ang Em was allowed to take the Cambodia crown in exchange for pledging allegiance to the Siamese. For their part, the Nguyễn lords wrested more territory from the weakened Cambodian kingdom.

Two decades later, in 1739, the Cambodians attempted to reclaim their lost coastal land. The fighting lasted some ten years, but the Vietnamese fended off the Cambodian raids and secured their hold on the rich Mekong Delta.

With Siam embroiled in war with Burma, the Nguyễn mounted another campaign against Cambodia in 1755 and conquered additional territory from the ineffective Cambodian court. At the end of the war the Nguyễn had secured a port on the Gulf of Siam (Hà Tiên) and were threatening Phnom Penh itself.

Under their new king Taksin, the Siamese reasserted its protection of its eastern neighbor by coming to the aid of the Cambodian court. War was launched against the Nguyễn in 1769. After some early success, the Nguyễn forces by 1773 were facing internal revolts and had to abandon Cambodia to deal with the civil war in Vietnam itself. The turmoil gave rise to the Tây Sơn.

=== End of the Nguyễn lords ===
In 1771, as a result of heavy taxes and defeats in the war with Cambodia, three brothers from Tây Sơn began a peasant uprising that quickly engulfed much of southern Vietnam. Within two years, the Tây Sơn brothers captured the provincial capital of Qui Nhơn. In 1774, the Trịnh in Hà Nội, seeing their rival gravely weakened, ended the hundred-year truce and launched an attack against the Nguyễn from the north. The Trịnh forces quickly overran the Nguyễn capital in 1774, while the Nguyễn lords fled south to Saigon. The Nguyễn fought against both the Trịnh army and the Tây Sơn, but their effort was in vain. By 1777, Gia Định was captured and nearly the entire Nguyễn family was killed except one nephew, Nguyễn Ánh, who managed to flee to Siam.

=== Nguyễn-Tây Sơn war (1778–1802) and establishment of Nguyễn dynasty ===
Nguyễn Ánh did not give up, and in 1780 he attacked the Tây Sơn army with a new army from Siam, having allied with the Siamese king Taksin. However, Taksin became a religious fanatic and was killed in a coup. The new king of Siam, Rama I had more urgent affairs to look after than helping Nguyễn Ánh retake Vietnam and so this campaign faltered. The Siamese army retreated, and Nguyễn Ánh went into exile, but would later return.

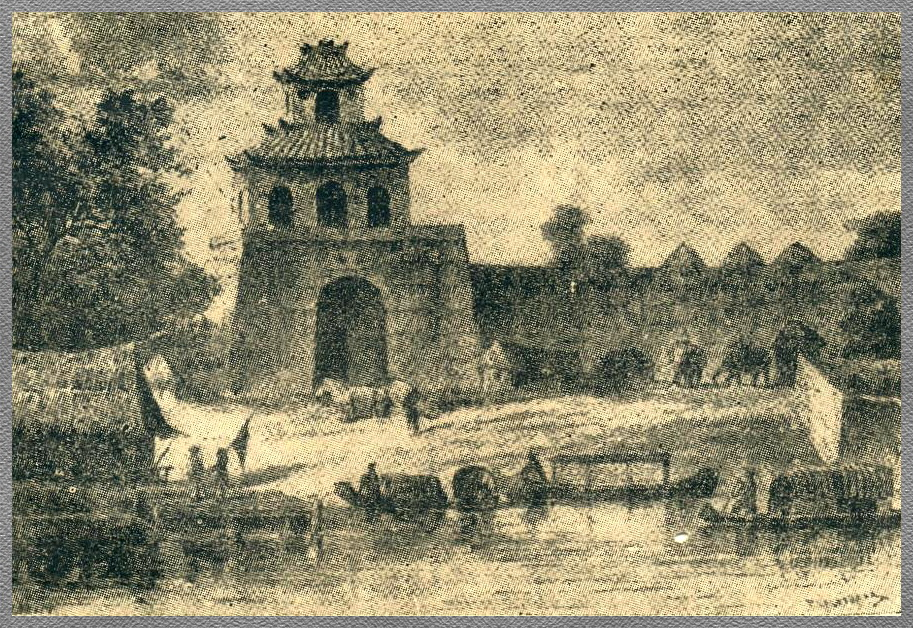
The main gate of Phu Xuan citadel

== Nguyễn foreign relations ==
The Nguyễn were significantly more open to foreign trade and communication with Europeans than the Trịnh. According to Dupuy, the Nguyễn were able to defeat initial Trịnh attacks with the aid of advanced weapons they purchased from the Portuguese. The Nguyễn also conducted fairly extensive trade with Japan and China.

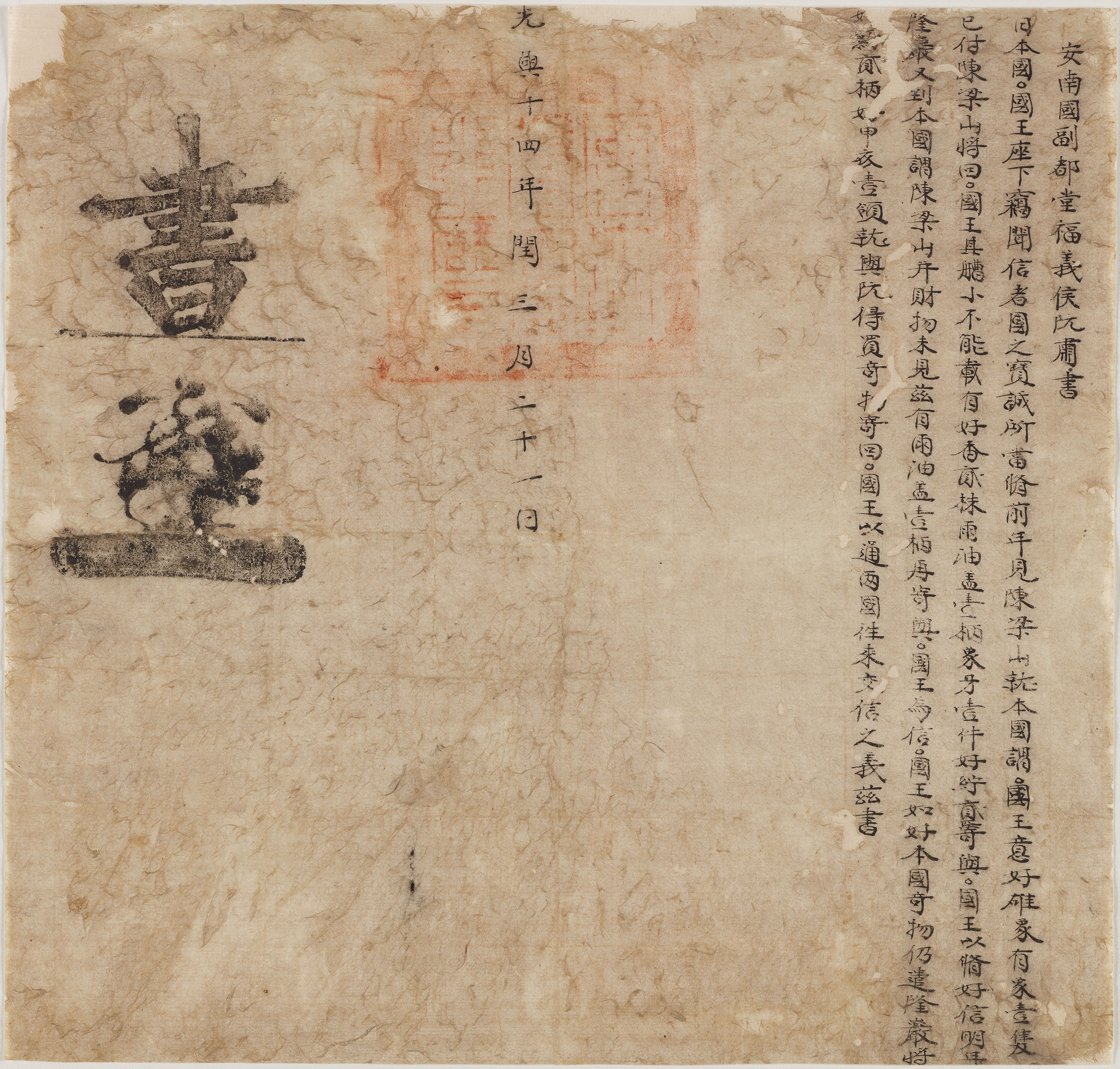
The letter of Marquis of Phúc Nghĩa (Nguyễn Cảnh Đoan) on behalf of Nguyen Hoang sent to Toyotomi Hideyoshi as King of Japan in 1591.

The Portuguese set up a trade center at Faifo (present day Hội An), just south of Huế in 1615. However, with the end of the great war between the Trịnh and the Nguyễn, the need for European military equipment declined. The Portuguese trade center never became a major European base unlike Goa or Macau.

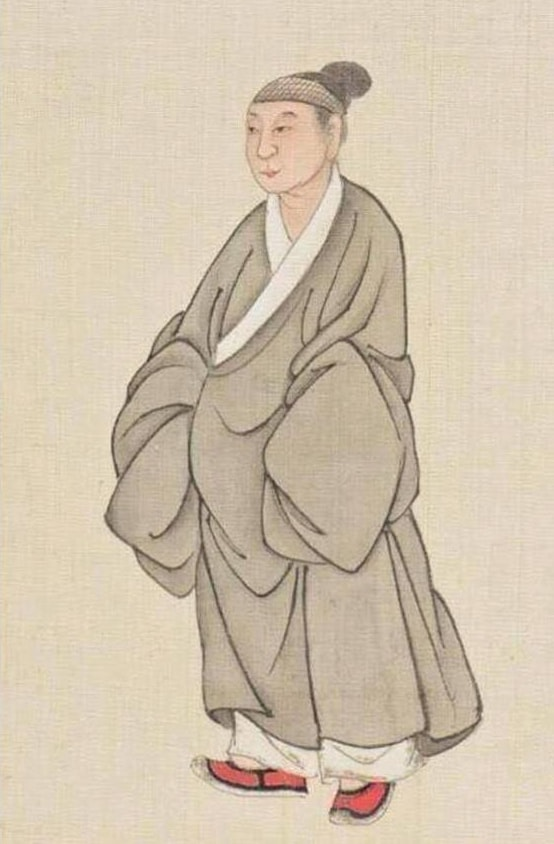
Southern Vietnamese people live in territory of Nguyễn

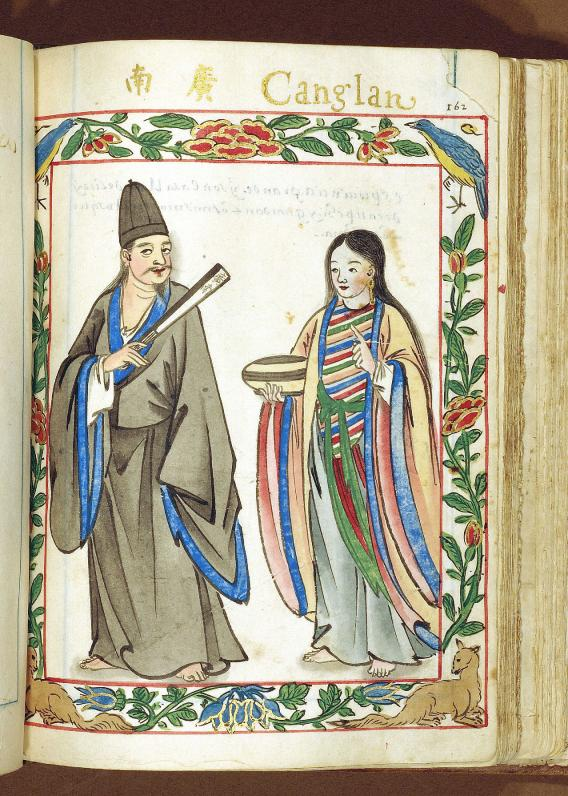
Vietnamese nobleman and wife from Quảng Nam (Đàng Trong) in 1595.

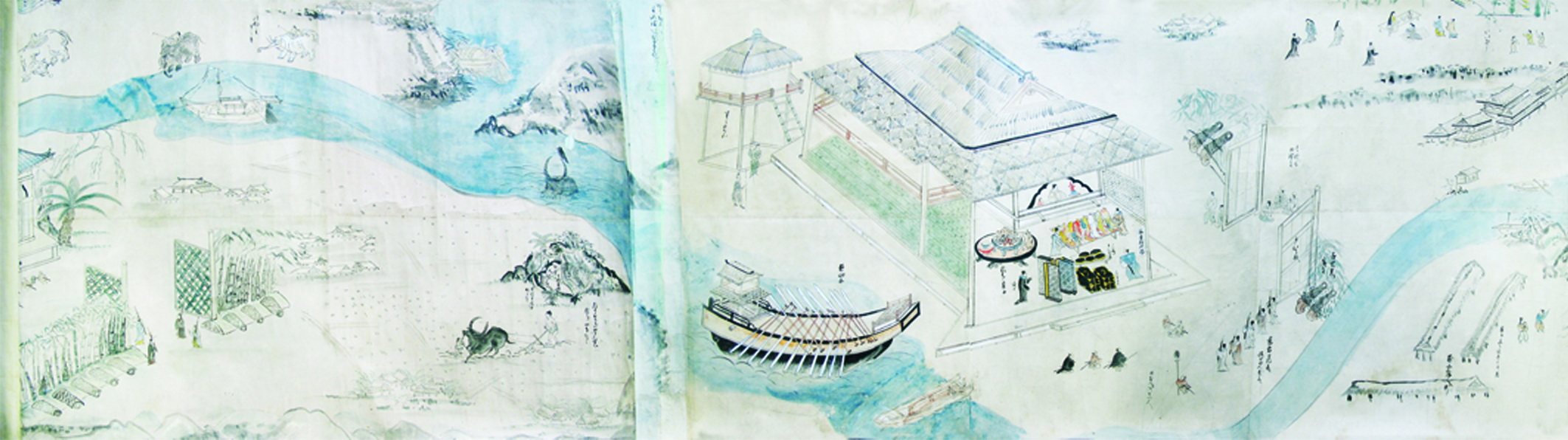
Hoi An in painting "Giao Chỉ quốc độ hàng đồ quyển " (交趾国渡航図巻)" of Chaya Shinroku (茶屋新六) in 17th century

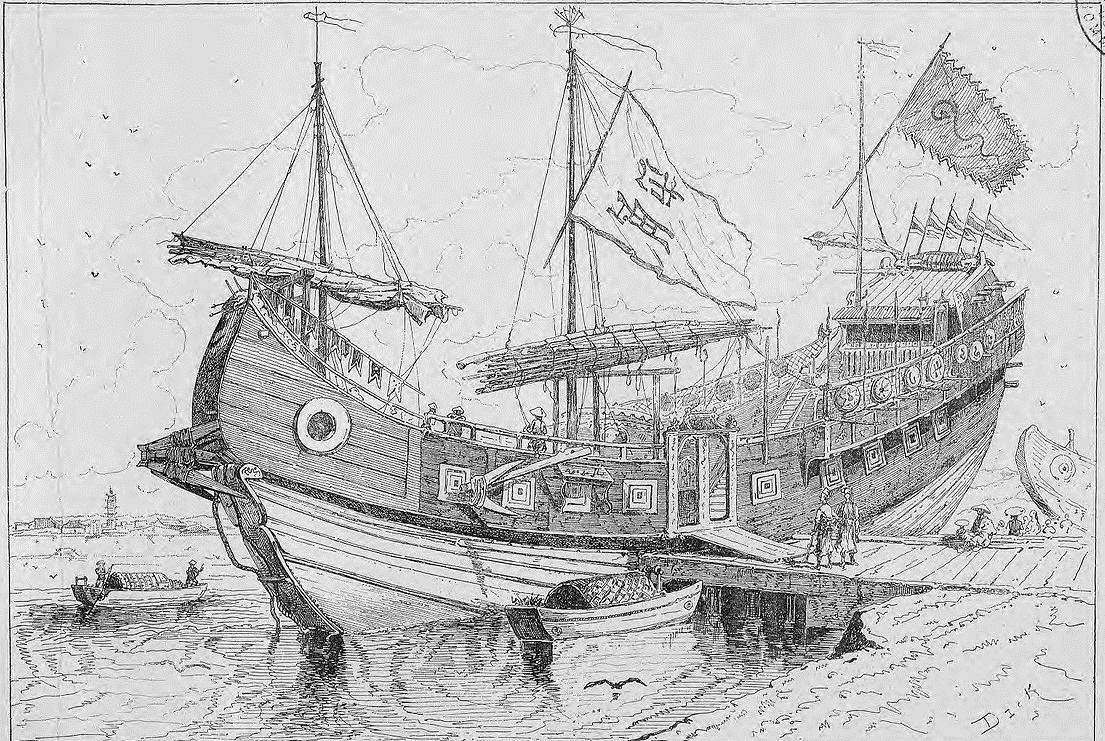
18th and 19th-century Vietnamese vessels were built based on French model

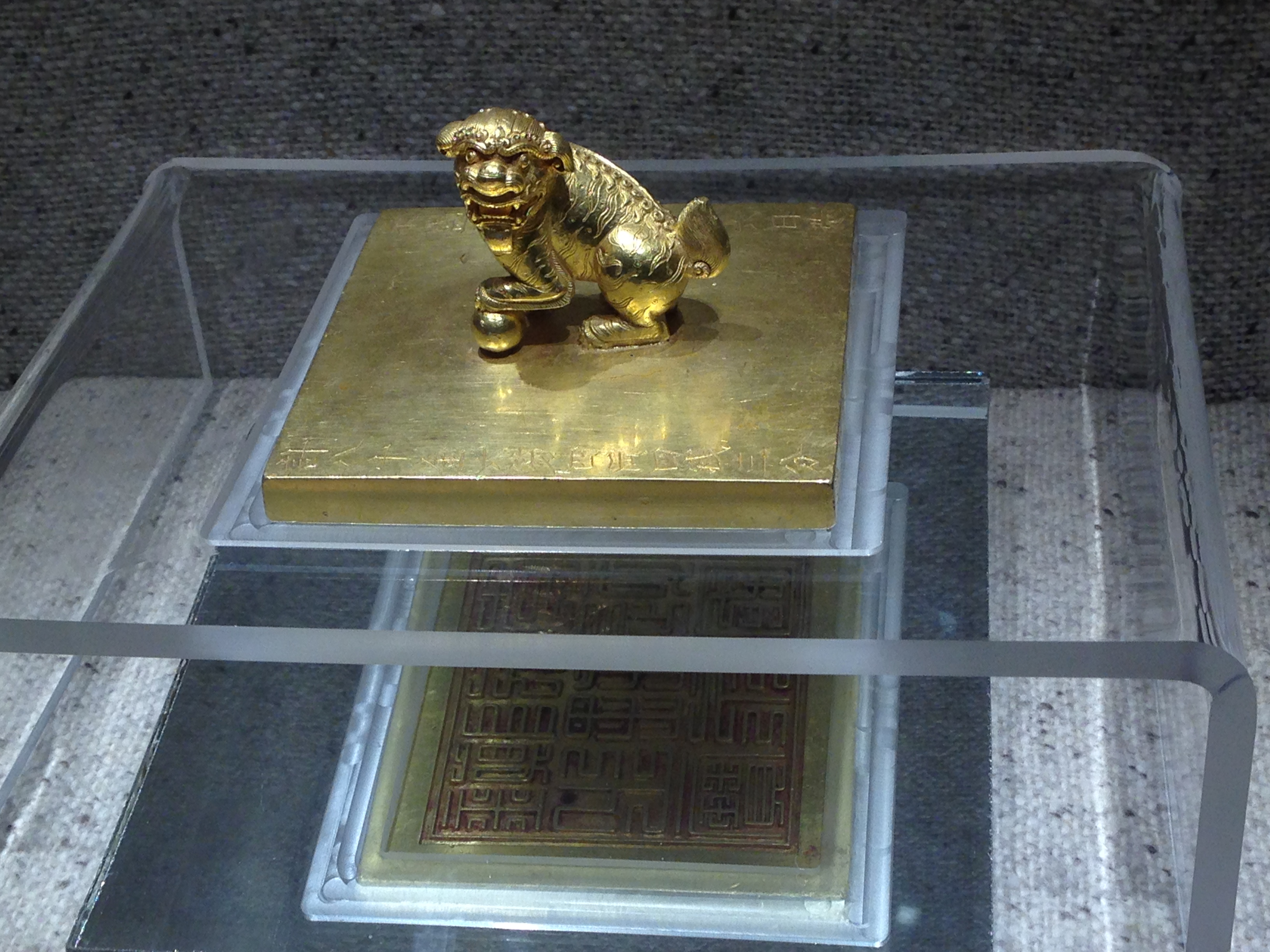
Courtesy seal of Nguyễn lord, gift of emperor Lê Hy Tông, dated 1709, inscribed with Chinese characters meaning Đại Việt quốc Nguyễn chúa vĩnh trấn chi bảo (大越國阮𪐴永鎮之寶)

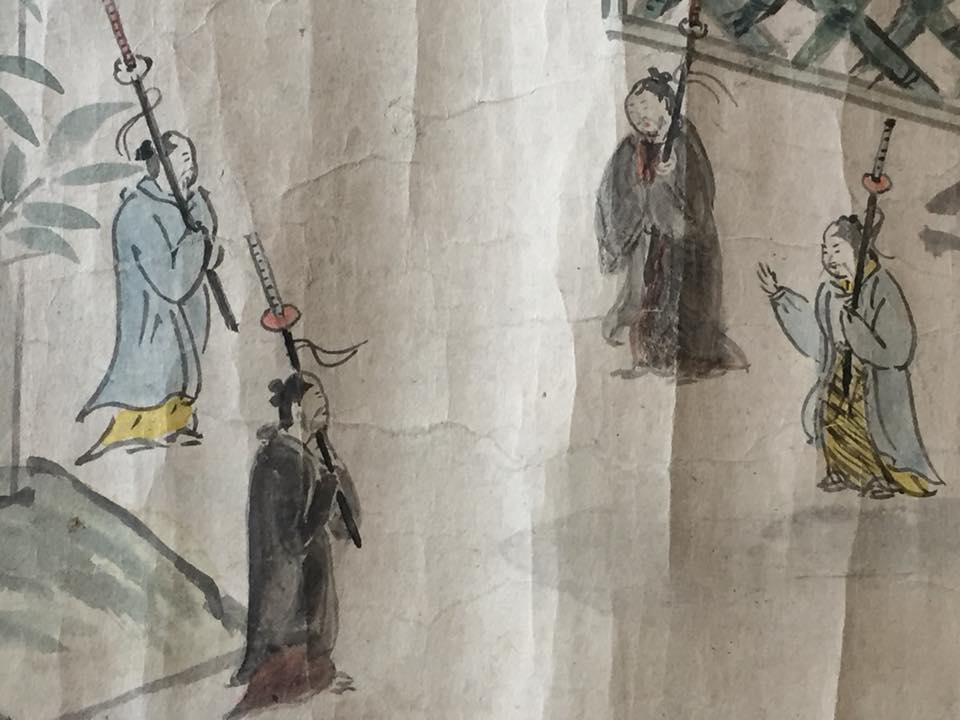
The soldiers of Nguyen lord, painting by Japanese

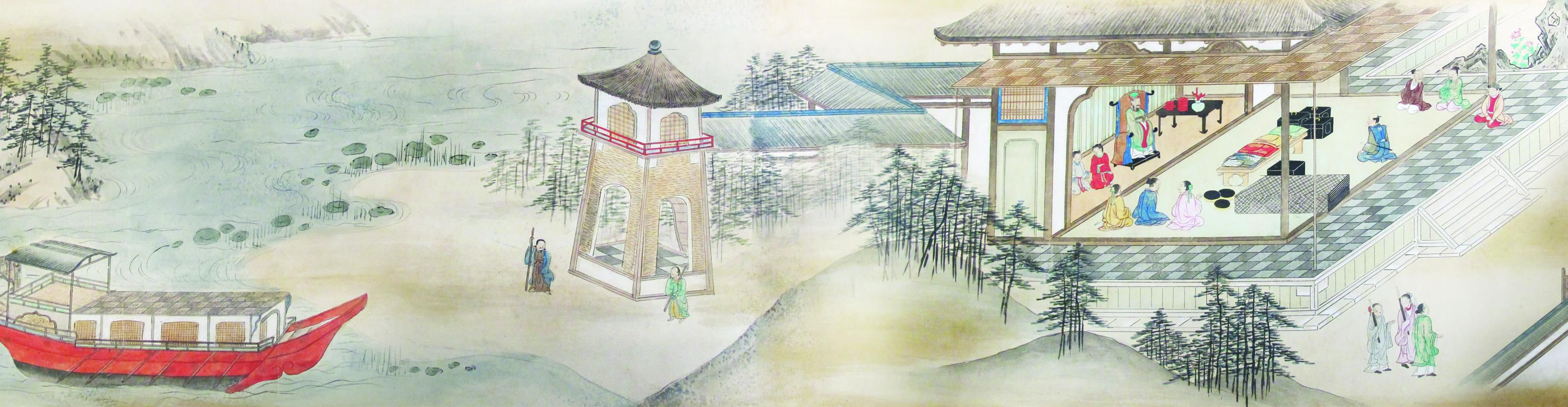
Japanese merchants pay tribute to chief mandarin at Governor house of Quang Nam in Hoi An, late 17th century

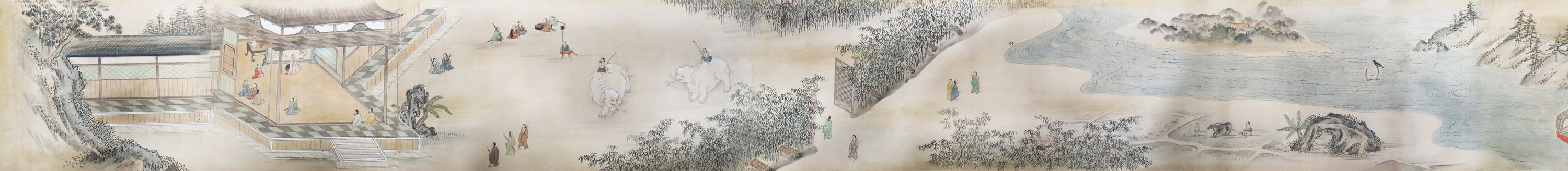
Japanese merchants pay tribute to Nguyễn lords at private mansion in Phú Xuân, late 17th century

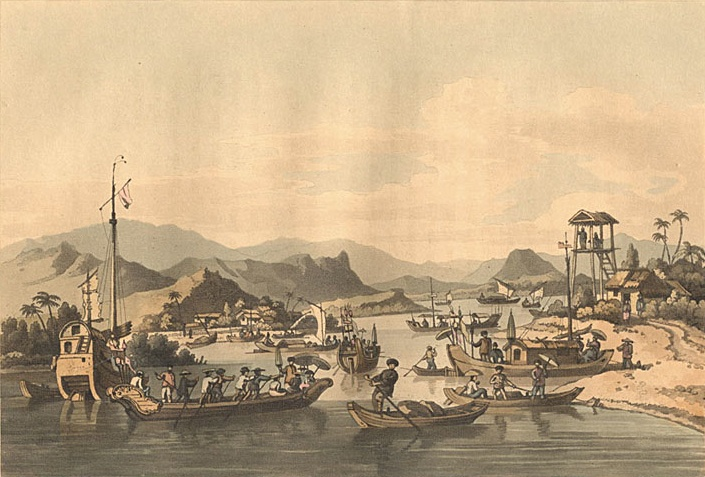
Hội An port in the 18th century

In 1640, Alexandre de Rhodes returned to Vietnam, this time to the Nguyễn court at Huế. He began work on converting people to the Catholic faith and building churches. After six years, the Nguyễn Lord, Nguyễn Phúc Lan, came to the same conclusion as Trịnh Tráng had, that de Rhodes and the Catholic Church represented a threat to their rule. De Rhodes was sentenced to death, but was allowed to leave Vietnam with the understanding he was to be executed if he returned.

Quảng Nam Province was the site where fourth rank Chinese brigade vice-commander dushu Liu Sifu was shipwrecked after suffering a storm. He was taken back to Guangzhou, China by a Vietnamese Nguyễn ship in 1669. The Vietnamese sent the Chinese Zhao Wenbin to led the diplomatic delegation on the ship and requested the establishment of trade relations with the Qing court. Although they thanked the Nguyễn for sending their officer safely home, they rejected the Nguyễn's offer. On Champa's coastal waters in a place called Linlangqian by the Chinese a ship ran aground after departing on 25 Jun 1682 from Cambodia carrying Chinese captain Chang Xiaoguan with a Chinese crew. Their cargo was left in the waters while Chen Xiaoguan went to Thailand (Siam). This was recorded in the log of a Chinese trading junk going to Nagasaki on 25 June 1683.

== List of the Nguyễn lords ==
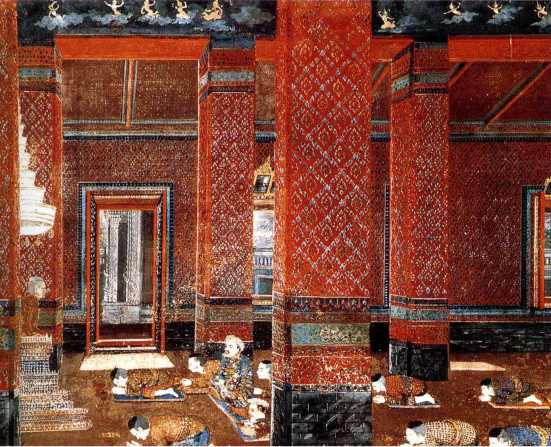
A painting of lord Nguyễn Phúc Ánh in audience with King Rama I in Phra Thinang Amarin Winitchai, Bangkok, 1782. This led to the alliance of Siam and the Nguyễn clan against the Tây Sơn dynasty at the Battle of Rạch Gầm-Xoài Mút

- Nguyễn Phúc Nguyên (1613–1635)
- Nguyễn Phúc Lan (1635–1648)
- Nguyễn Phúc Tần (1648–1687)
- Nguyễn Phúc Thái (1687–1691)
- Nguyễn Phúc Chu (1691–1725)
- Nguyễn Phúc Thụ (1725–1738)
- Nguyễn Phúc Khoát (1738–1765)
- Nguyễn Phúc Thuần (1765–1777)
- Nguyễn Phúc Dương (1776–1777, co-ruled with Nguyễn Phúc Thuần)
- Nguyễn Phúc Ánh (1780–1802)

Preceded by Mạc dynasty	Rulers of southern Vietnam; 1558–1777, 1780–1802	Succeeded by Tây Sơn dynasty

== Family tree ==
Nguyễn lords family tree

Nguyễn Kim
Ngọc Bảo wife of Trịnh Kiểm	Nguyễn Uông	Nguyễn Hoàng
Nguyễn Phúc Hà	Nguyễn Phúc Hán	Nguyễn Phúc Thành	Nguyễn Phúc Diễn	Nguyễn Phúc Hải	Nguyễn Phúc Nguyên	Nguyễn Phúc Hợp	Nguyễn Phúc Trạch	Nguyễn Phúc Khê
Nguyễn Phúc Vệ	Nguyễn Phúc Tuyên	Nguyễn Phúc Tuấn	Nguyễn Phúc Kỳ	Nguyễn Phúc Lan	Nguyễn Phúc Ánh	Nguyễn Phúc Trung	Nguyễn Phúc Tứ	Nguyễn Phúc Diệu
? (name is unknown)	Nguyễn Phúc Tần	Nguyễn Phúc Thăng
Nguyễn Phúc Diễn	Nguyễn Phúc Trăn	Nguyễn Phúc Hiệp
Nguyễn Phúc Chu	Nguyễn Phúc Trinh
Nguyễn Phúc Trú	Nguyễn Phúc Tứ	Nguyễn Phúc Điền	Nguyễn Phúc Phong
Nguyễn Phúc Khoát	Nguyễn Phúc Nghiêm
Nguyễn Phúc Chương	Nguyễn Phúc Luân	Nguyễn Phúc Văn	Nguyễn Phúc Chí	Nguyễn Phúc Hiệu	Nguyễn Phúc Thuần
Nguyễn Phúc Cao	Nguyễn Phúc Đồng	Nguyễn Phúc Ánh	Nguyễn Phúc Mân	Nguyễn Phúc Điển	Nguyễn Phúc Dương

Notes:

- Only notable family members are listed.
- See also Nguyễn dynasty#Lineage.

Tran Trong Kim (2005). Việt Nam sử lược (in Vietnamese). Ho Chi Minh City: Ho Chi Minh city General Publishing House. p. 328.

== See also ==
- Nguyễn dynasty
- List of Vietnamese dynasties
- Nguyen, the surname

== Citations ==
- "Ao Dai". Vietnam Online. Vietnam Online.com. 2018.
- Aung-Thwin, Michael Arthur; Hall, Kenneth R. (13 May 2011). New Perspectives on the History and Historiography of Southeast Asia: Continuing Explorations. Routledge. ISBN 978-1-136-81964-3.
- Bridgeman, Elijah Coleman; Williams, Samuel Wells (1847). The Chinese Repository. Proprietors.
- Chapuis, Oscar (1995). A History of Vietnam: From Hong Bang to Tu Duc. Greenwood Publishing Group. ISBN 9780313296222.
- Choi Byung Wook (2004). Southern Vietnam Under the Reign of Minh Mạng (1820–1841): Central Policies and Local Response. SEAP Publications. ISBN 978-0-87727-138-3.
- Coedes, George (1966). The Making of South East Asia. University of California Press. ISBN 978-0-520-05061-7.
- Coedes, George (2015). The Making of South East Asia (RLE Modern East and South East Asia). Taylor & Francis. ISBN 978-1-317-45094-8.
- Hardy, Andrew David; Cucarzi, Mauro; Zolese, Patrizia (2009). Champa and the Archaeology of Mỹ Sơn (Vietnam).
- Khoang, Phan (2001). Việt sử xứ Đàng Trong (in Vietnamese). Hanoi: Văn Học Publishing House.
- Kohn, George Childs (1999). Dictionary of Wars Revised Edition. Facts on File.
- Mateo, José Eugenio Borao (2009). The Spanish Experience in Taiwan 1626–1642: The Baroque Ending of a Renaissance Endeavour (illustrated ed.). Hong Kong University Press. ISBN 978-9622090835.
- Pelley, Patricia M. (2002). Postcolonial Vietnam: New Histories of the National Past.
- Reid, Anthony (9 May 1990). Southeast Asia in the Age of Commerce, 1450–1680: The Lands Below the Winds. Yale University Press. ISBN 978-0-300-04750-9.
- Taylor, Keith Weller and John K. Whitmore (1995). Essays into Vietnamese Pasts.
- "Vietnamese Ao Dai: From Dong Son Bronze Drum to Int'l Beauty Contests". Vietnam Breaking News. 2019.
- Werner, Jayne; Whitmore, John K.; Dutton, George (21 August 2012). Sources of Vietnamese Tradition. Columbia University Press. ISBN 978-0-231-51110-0.
- Wong Tze Ken, Danny (2004). "Vietnam-Champa Relations and the Malay-Islam Regional Network in the 17th–19th Centuries". Internet Archive Wayback Machine. Archived from the original on 17 June 2004.

== General references ==
- Dupuy, R. Ernest and Trevor N. (1993). The Encyclopedia of Military History. Harper & Row. ISBN 9780062700568.
