= Nguyễn Hoàng =

Nguyễn Hoàng 阮潢
- Nguyễn lords Lord of Đàng Trong
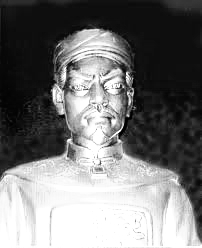
- The statue of Nguyễn Hoàng

Nguyễn Lords
- Reign: 14 February 1558 – 20 July 1613
- Predecessor: Military Commander established
- Successor: Nguyễn Phúc Nguyên
- Born: 28 August 1525; Thanh Hóa Province
- Died: 20 July 1613 (aged 87); Đàng Trong
- Spouse: Nguyễn Thị
- Issue: Nguyễn Phúc Nguyên
Names
- Nguyễn Hoàng (阮潢)
Regnal name
- Chúa Tiên (主僊 "Lord Tiên")
Posthumous name
- Triệu Cơ Thùy Thống Khâm Minh Cung Ý Cần Nghĩa Đạt Lý hiển Ứng Chiêu Hựu Diệu Linh Gia Dụ Hoàng Đế 肇基垂統欽明恭懿謹義達理顯應昭祐耀靈嘉裕皇帝
Temple name
- Thái Tổ (太祖)
- House: Nguyễn
- Father: Nguyễn Kim
- Mother: Nguyễn Thị Mai
- Religion: Buddhism

Nguyễn Hoàng (28 August 1525 – 20 July 1613) was a Vietnamese official who ruled southern Vietnam from 1558 to his death in 1613. As the first of the Nguyễn lords, he established a powerful state that contested rule over Vietnam for the next two centuries. He was the ancestor of Nguyễn Ánh, who would later become emperor of a united Vietnam.

== Early life ==
He was the second son of Nguyễn Kim. When his father was assassinated by a Mạc supporter, his brother-in-law Trịnh Kiểm took command of the Lê royalist army. Sometime after his older brother (Nguyễn Uông) died (believed to have been poisoned by Trịnh Kiểm), Nguyễn Hoàng requested his brother in law, and was appointed to govern the southern province of Vietnam (Thuận Hóa). This land was formerly Champa territory which had been ceded to Đại Việt by Cham king Jaya Simhavarman III and at the time was under control of Mạc force. Nguyễn Hoàng defeated the enemy commander Duke of Lập and took over the province in 1558. In 1573 he was given the title Grand Master (Thái phó) by Emperor Lê Thế Tông. Later he was given the title Duke of Môn (Môn Công).

== Rule ==
In 1592, when Trịnh Tùng laid siege to the Mạc's capital city (modern-day Hanoi), Nguyễn Hoàng lend him resources and troops. The Nguyen army joined the Royal (Trịnh) army and helped destroy the remainder of the Mạc army. For reasons that are mysterious, when the new Emperor, Lê Kinh Tông, ascended the throne, Nguyễn Hoàng refused to recognize the new sovereign and instead took for himself the new title of Good Prince (Huu Vuong) in 1600. Perhaps an explanation is found in that his nephew Trịnh Tùng had been given a similar title just one year earlier: Pacifying Prince (Bình An Vương). Nguyễn Hoàng had many children (10 sons) but most of them either lost their lives in the battlefields or stayed in the North. His 6th son Nguyễn Phúc Nguyên succeeded him upon his death in 1613. He ruled the south for 55 years.

The reason Trịnh Kiểm appointed Nguyễn Hoàng to the Southern provinces is not clear. As anecdote goes, Trinh Kiểm, being afraid of losing power to Nguyễn brothers, ordered the assassination of Nguyễn Hoàng's older brother. As for Hoang, Trịnh Kiểm wanted to take advantage of Mạc's southern garrison troops to eliminate his brother in law.

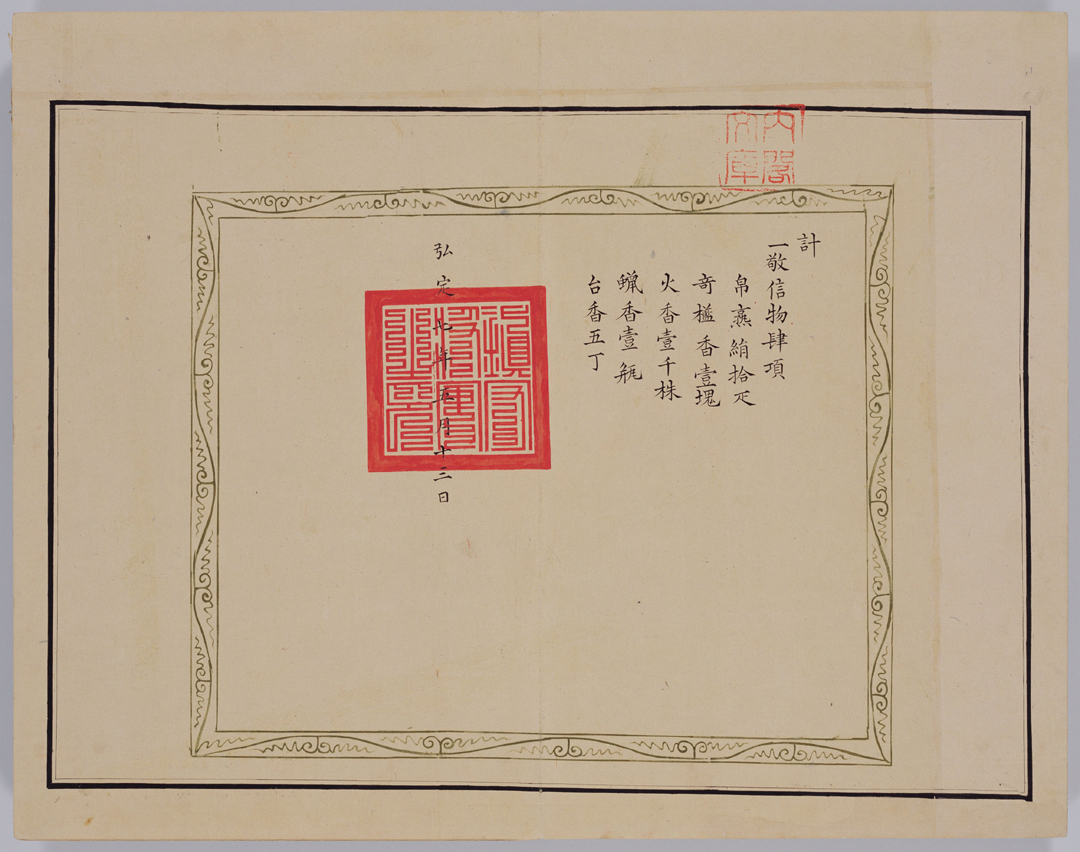
Letter Written by Nguyễn Hoàng to Shogun Tokugawa Ieyasu in May 1606 about trading matter between Đàng Trong and Tokugawa shogunate.

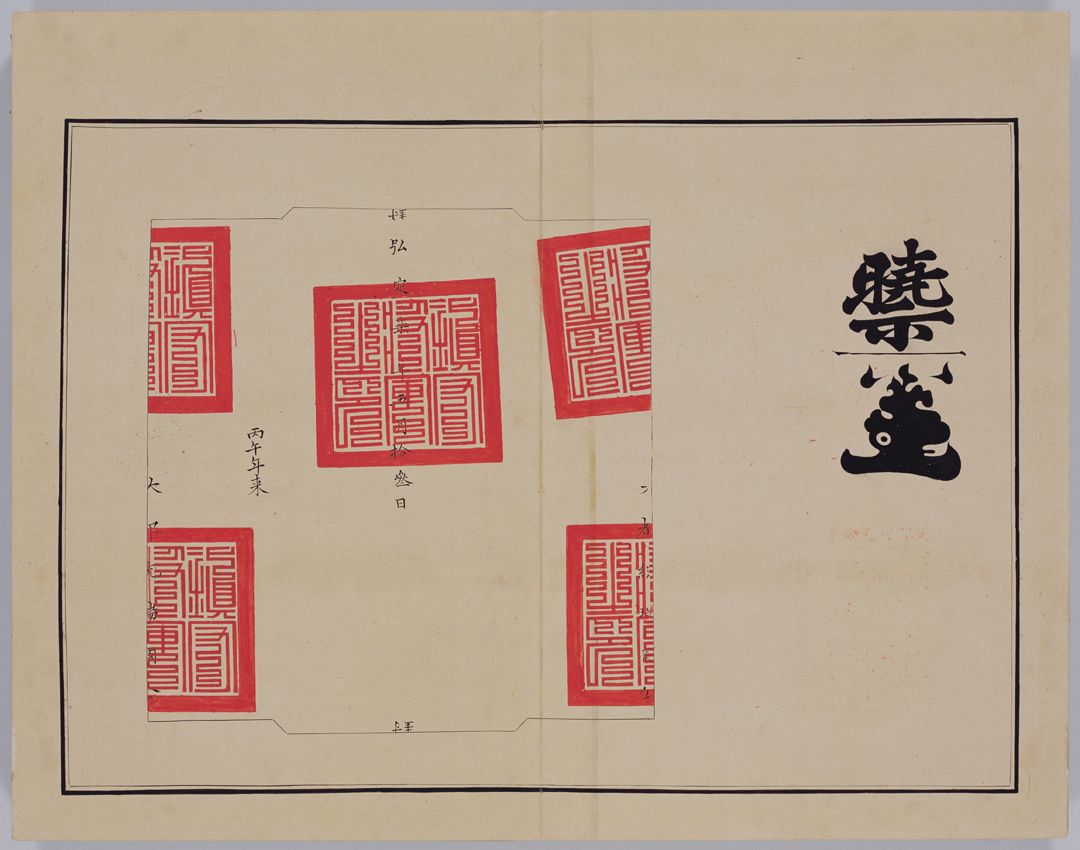
Letter Written by Nguyễn Hoàng to Shogun Tokugawa Ieyasu in May 1606 about trading matter between Đàng Trong and Tokugawa shogunate.

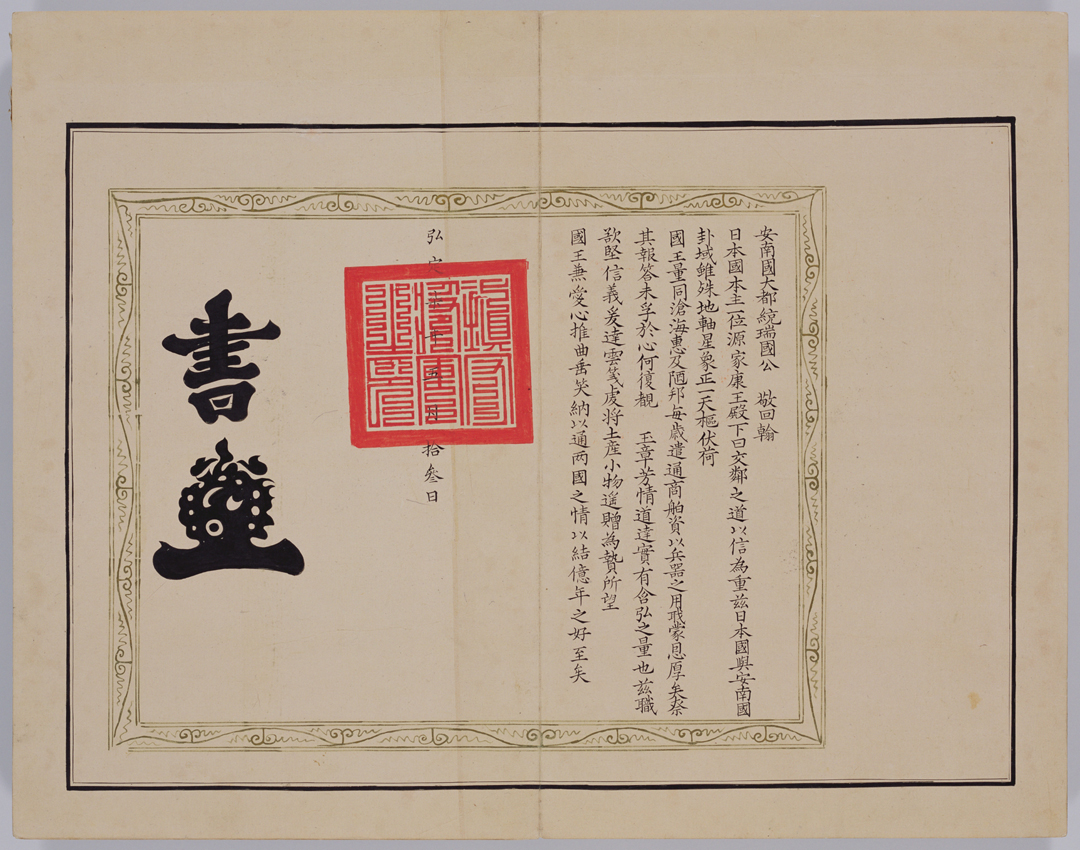
Letter Written by Nguyễn Hoàng to Shogun Tokugawa Ieyasu in May 1606 about trading matter between Đàng Trong and Tokugawa shogunate.

During his time in the south, Nguyễn Hoàng held court in multiple capitals: Ái Tử (1558–70), Trà Bát (1570–1600), and Dinh Cát (modern-day Huế, 1600–13).

== Legacy ==
Nguyễn Hoàng is still fondly remembered in central and southern Vietnam, especially in Huế where he and his descendants established their final capital. In 2013, his 400th death anniversary was celebrated in Huế.

== See also ==
- Lê dynasty
- List of Vietnamese dynasties

== Sources ==
- Encyclopedia of Asian History, Volume 3 (Nguyen Lords) 1988. Charles Scribner's Sons, New York.
- [Genealogy of the Royal Nguyen Family]
- Annam and its Minor Currency Chapter 16 (downloaded May 2006)

Vietnamese royalty
Preceded by Nguyễn Kim	Nguyễn lords	Succeeded by Nguyễn Phúc Nguyên
title established	Lord of Đàng Trong; 1558–1613	Succeeded by Nguyễn Phúc Nguyên
