= Đàng Trong =

Former realm in Vietnam

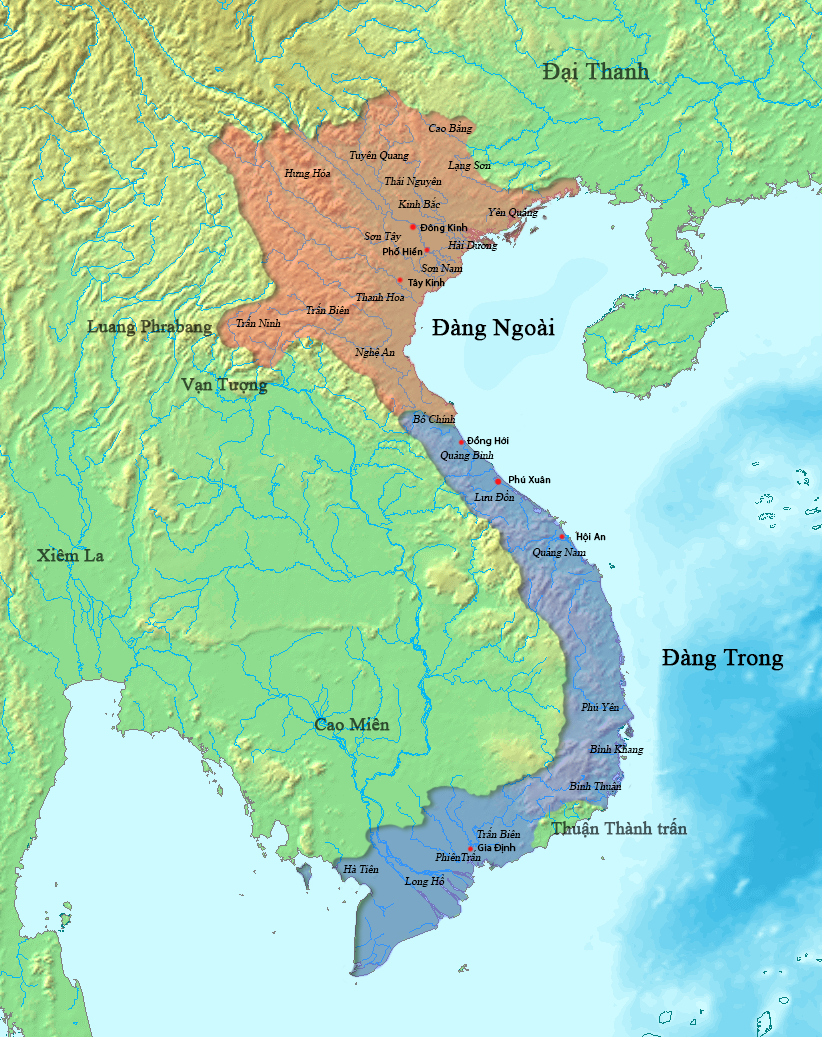
Đàng Trong in blue and Đàng Ngoài (1757).

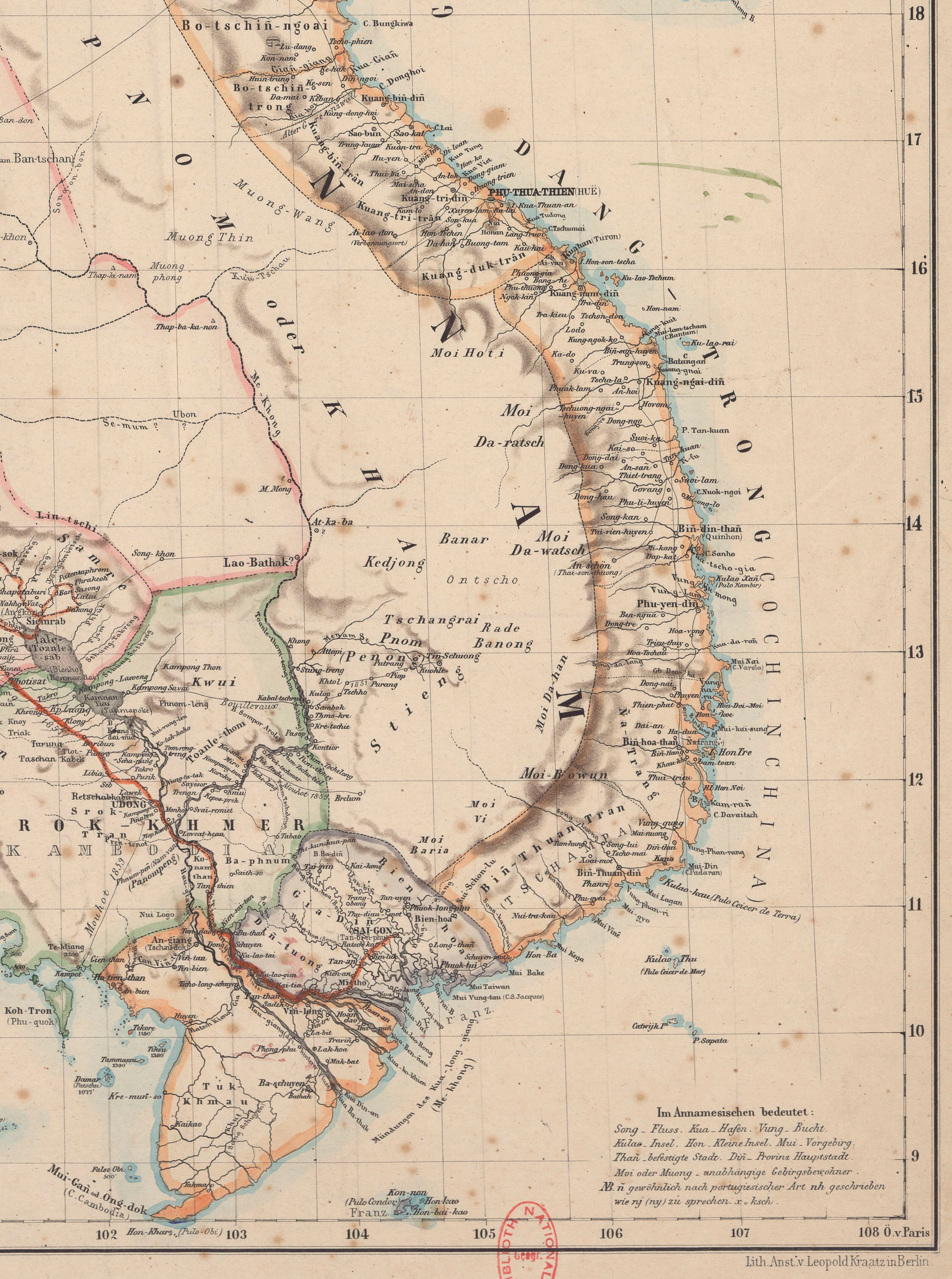
Former Đàng Trong in a German map

Đàng Trong (chữ Nôm: 唐冲, lit. "Inner Circuit"), also known as Nam Hà (chữ Hán: 南河, "South of the River"), was the region of Vietnam south of the Gianh River, under the lordship of the Nguyễn clan, and later expanded through Vietnamese southward expansion. It was bordered to the north by Đàng Ngoài, ruled by the Lê–Trịnh.

Throughout the 17th century and most of the 18th century, the Nguyễn lords, though claiming loyalty to the Lê emperors in Thăng Long (Hanoi), ruled Đàng Trong as a de facto independent kingdom. Nguyễn rulers titled themselves as Chúa (chữ Nôm: 主, lit. "Lord") instead of Vua (chữ Nôm: 𤤰, lit. "King") until Lord Nguyễn Phúc Khoát officially claimed the title Vũ Vương (chữ Nôm: 武王, lit. "Martial King") in 1744. (Note: This action does not necessarily mean Nguyễn Phúc Khoát renounced his status as a nominal subject of Lê emperors. For an analogy, in 216 Emperor Xian of Han bestowed the nominal vassal king title "King of Wei" (魏王) upon Grand chancellor Cao Cao)

== Names ==
The terms Đàng Trong and Đàng Ngoài originated in the 1620s and were first recorded in the Dictionarium Annamiticum Lusitanum et Latinum by Alexandre de Rhodes. Contemporary European sources referred to Đàng Trong as Cochinchina and its variants. Other foreigners also referred to it as the Kingdom of Quảng Nam (chữ Hán: 廣南國, Quảng Nam quốc) after the Quảng Nam Governorate where the important harbor Hội An (Faifo) located, hence the Dutch term Quinam.

== See also ==
The dictionary definition of Đàng Trong at Wiktionary

- Đàng Ngoài (Trịnh lords)
- Đàng Trên (Mạc lords)
