= Trần Khánh Dư =

Trần Khánh Dư 陳慶餘
- Prince Nhân Huệ
- Born: 1240; Chí Linh, Hải Dương, Đại Việt
- Died: 1340 (aged 99–100) trại An Trung, Lý Nhân, Hà Nam Đại Việt
- House: Trần dynasty
- Father: Trần Thái Tông

Prince Nhân Huệ Trần Khánh Dư (?–1339) was the adopted prince of the Retired Emperor Trần Thánh Tông and a general of Đại Việt army in royal court of four successive emperors of the Trần dynasty: Thánh Tông, Nhân Tông, Anh Tông, and Minh Tông. Although notoriously known by his greedy character in peace, Trần Khánh Dư was a prominent general during the war of resistance by the Trần dynasty against the second and third invasions of the Yuan dynasty. Especially, Prince Nhân Huệ was considered one of the most skilled commander of Trần navy who was credited with the victory of Đại Việt in Battle of Vân Đồn (1287).

== Background ==
The exact birthdate of Trần Khánh Dư was unknown but it was said that he was the son of general Trần Phó Duyệt from whom he inherited the noble title Marquis Nhân Huệ (Vietnamese: Nhân Huệ hầu). After Trần Khánh Dư defeated the Yuan army during a skirmish in northern border, the Retired Emperor Trần Thánh Tông praised his talent and decided to make him adopted son of the Emperor (Thiên tử nghĩa nam), Trần Khánh Dư was thus entitled as Prince Nhân Huệ (Nhân Huệ vương). Being a gifted general, Trần Khánh Dư successfully pacified a revolt in the mountainous region of Đại Việt and was rapidly promoted in military rank from senior official (phó đô tướng quân) to commander in chief (phiêu kỵ tướng quân), a top-ranking position which was reserved exclusively for the Emperor's princes.

The advancement of Prince Nhân Huệ was destroyed by his adulterous affair with Princess Thiên Thụy, wife of Prince Hưng Vũ Trần Quốc Nghiễn and daughter-in-law of Trần Hưng Đạo who was one of the most powerful figures of Trần family and royal court. In order to avoid the fury from Trần Hưng Đạo, the Emperor Trần Thái Tông instructed his officials beat Trần Khánh Dư to death in West Lake but actually the Emperor spared Prince Nhân Huệ's life and only deprived him from all titles and properties except the land grants in Chí Linh that Trần Khánh Dư inherited from his father. As a result, Trần Khánh Dư had to earn his life by charcoal trading which was still considered a humble profession at that time.

== Military activities ==
In 1279, the Yuan dynasty had the decisive victory over the Song dynasty in the Battle of Yamen- trận Nhai Sơn, which marked the end of the Song dynasty and the total control of Kublai Khan over China. As a result, Kublai Khan began to expose his attempt to take over the southern countries like Đại Việt or Champa. Facing the threat from northern border, in October 1282, the retired Emperor Trần Thánh Tông and the Emperor Trần Nhân Tông gathered all members of royal family, Trần clan and officials in royal court in Bình Than to discuss about the unavoidable war. Incidentally, the Emperor met Trần Khánh Dư, who was doing his business near the meeting place and since ordered an issue to pardon Trấn Khánh Dư's guilt and permitted him to participate in the Trần dynasty's preparation for the war of resistance. Trần Khánh Dư was soon appointed as general of Trần's army under grand commander Trần Hưng Đạo.

The role of Prince Nhân Huệ in Đại Việt's army became prominent during the third invasion of Đại Việt by the Yuan dynasty in 1287. Until then Trần Khánh Dư was the general who took charge of Trần naval base in Vân Đồn Island, the advance post of Đại Việt. At the beginning of the invasion, Prince Nhân Huệ was unable to stop the Yuan navy in Vân Đồn, a failure that Yuan troops profited to advance toward Vạn Kiếp where the principal force of Đại Việt stationed. Hence, the Retired Emperor Thánh Tông intended to imprisoned him but Trần Khánh Dư begged for several days to achieve a feat against Yuan navy before being punished. Eventually in December 1287, Prince Nhân Huệ used his remnants of navy to destroy the logistics convoy of Yuan navy in the Battle of Vân Đồn which created a favourable situation on the battlefield for the Trần dynasty to repel the invasion. For his victory in Vân Đồn, Trần Khánh Dư was credited with the low casualties of Đại Việt during the third Mongol invasion.

After three Mongol invasions, Đại Việt ultimately enjoyed a long period of stability and prosperity. During this time, Trần Khánh Dư participated in several military activities like the campaign against Champa in 1312 or the military and civil inspection in Diễn Châu in 1316. In the 1312 campaign led by the Emperor Anh Tông, Prince Nhân Huệ was nearly punished for attacking the convoy of Champa king Chế Chí, who had already surrendered to Anh Tông.

== After the war ==
Although being heavily punished one time for his guilt, Trần Khánh Dư was proved to be always a greedy official in peace time. He profited from his position as commander of Vân Đồn Island gain wealth by selling goods to native people. The often malevolent characteristics of Prince Nhân Huệ made him a despised figure he took charge and he maintained his position because Emperor Nhân Tông did not want to lose his military talents. One occasion, Prince Nhân Huệ was charged with political corruption and abuse of administrative authority, his reaction to the accusations with a memorable quote: "Generals are hawks, soldiers are ducks, why would feeding ducks to the hawks be any surprise?" ("Tướng là chim ưng, dân lính là vịt, dùng vịt để nuôi chim ưng thì có gì là lạ?"), an argument that the Emperor was not sastified with.

Besides his administrative activities, Trần Khánh Dư was also a well-known military scholar. It was Prince Nhân Huệ who personally redacted the presentation for Vạn Kiếp tông bí truyền thư, the military treatise composed by Trần Hưng Đạo.

Prince Nhân Huệ Khánh Dư died in 1339 during the reign of the Emperor Trần Hiến Tông.

== Legacy ==
Although notoriously known by his greedy character in peace, Trần Khánh Dư was considered one of the most important generals of the Trần dynasty who helped several Trần emperors repel the Yuan army. His talent is still renowned today, a main street in Hanoi and many places in Vietnam are named in honour of Trần Khánh Dư. Each year in July, a traditional festival is held in Quan Lạn, Quảng Ninh to commemorate the feats of Trần Khánh Dư and the victory against the Mongol invaders. Most cities in Vietnam, regardless of the political orientation of the government, have named major streets after him.
