= Trần Quốc Toản =

- Marquis Hoài Văn
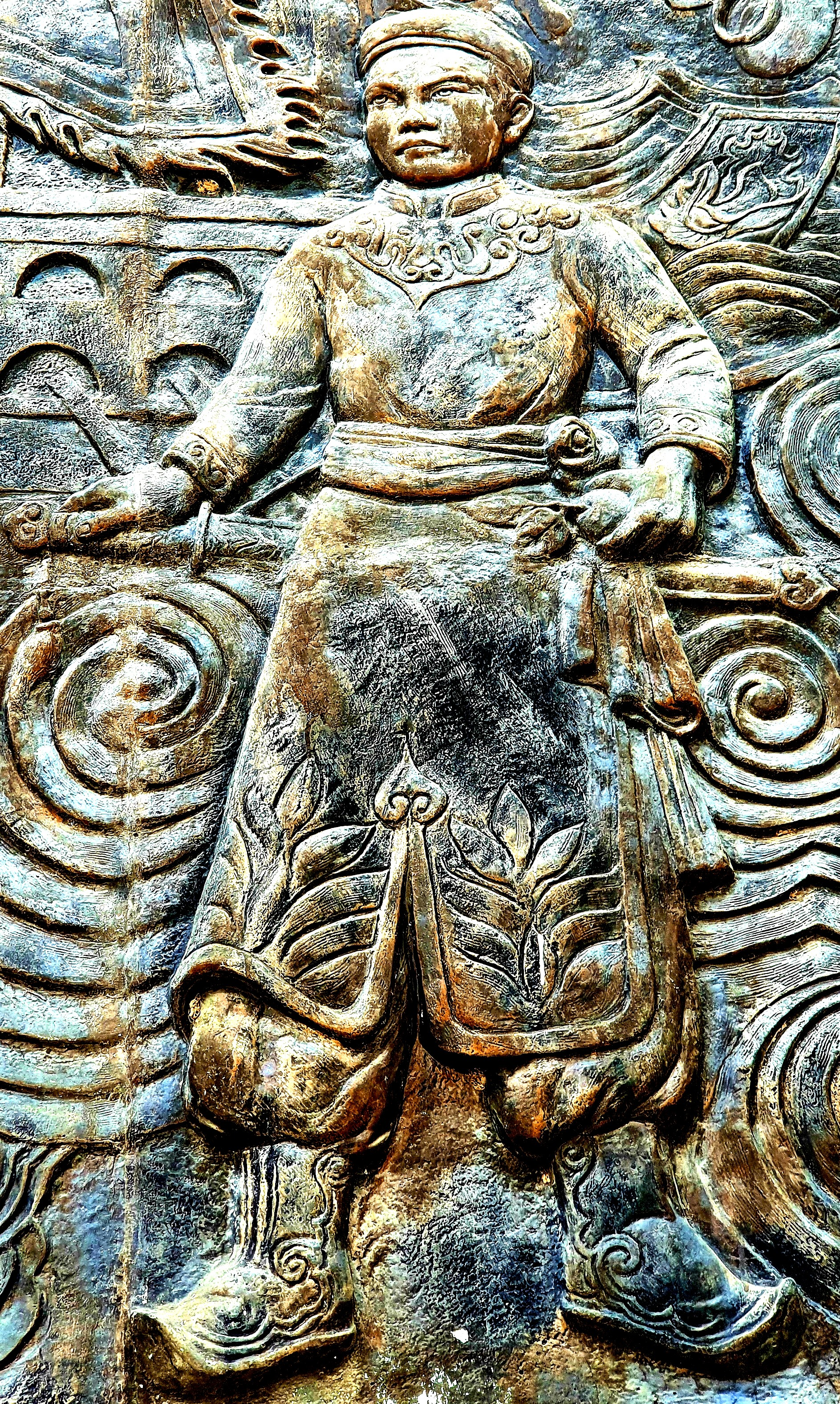
- Trần Quốc Toản in Nguyễn dynasty costume
- Born: 1267; Thien Truong, Đại Việt
- Died: July 15, 1285 (aged 17–18)
- House: Trần dynasty

Marquis Hoài Văn, better known as Trần Quốc Toản (chữ Hán: 陳國瓚), born 1267 (fl. 1267–1285), was a marquis of the Trần dynasty who was well known for his active role in the second war of resistance of Đại Việt against the Mongol invasion. Although there were only a few historical records about Trần Quốc Toản, he is still widely known as an example of patriotism in Vietnam while he participated and ultimately sacrificed himself for the country at a very young age. Today, story about Trần Quốc Toản is taught in Vietnamese schoolbooks and many places in Vietnam are named in honour of this young hero.

== History ==
According to Từ điển Bách khoa toàn thư Việt Nam, Marquis Hoài Văn (Vietnamese: Hoài Văn hầu) Trần Quốc Toản was born in 1267 during the reign of the Emperor Trần Thánh Tông.

In 1279, the Yuan dynasty had the decisive victory over the Song dynasty in Battle of Yamen which marked the end of the Song dynasty and the total control of Kublai Khan over China. As a result, Kublai Khan began to expose his attempt to take over the southern countries like Đại Việt or Champa. It was said that facing threat from the north, in October 1282, the Retired Emperor Trần Thánh Tông and the Emperor Trần Nhân Tông gathered all members of royal family, the Trần clan and officials in royal court in Bình Than to discuss about the unadvoidable war. Although being a member of the royal family, Trần Quốc Toản was not invited because the 16-year-old marquis was too young to be considered in the meeting. As a result, Marquis Hoài Văn felt so ashamed and stimulated that he crushed an orange (given to him by the Emperor in recognition of his courage and valor despite his youth) with his own hand and began to mobilize his house servants and relatives for the purpose of fighting against the Yuan dynasty. Eventually, Trần Quốc Toản was able to form an army of over one thousand soldiers and he created himself a flag with six characters:

Phá cường địch, báo hoàng ân
Defeat the strong enemy to repay the Emperor's grace

Ngô Sĩ Liên, in his work Đại Việt sử kí toàn thư, did not have an extensive account about Trần Quốc Toản; the historian only acknowledged that Marquis Hoài Văn's troops always fought bravely against the army of the Yuan dynasty so that they had to retreat when facing Trần Quốc Toản. In the victory of Đại Việt over Mongol general Sogetu's navy in the Battle of Hàm Tử in April 1285, Marquis Hoài Văn was one of the main commanders of Đại Việt's army besides Prince Chiêu Văn Trần Nhật Duật, Prince Chiêu Thành and general Nguyễn Khoái. On the tenth day of the fifth lunar month (June 14) 1285, Trần Quốc Toản continued to fight under the command of Prince Chiêu Minh Trần Quang Khải in the decisive Battle of Chương Dương in which Sogetu's navy was almost destroyed and Kublai Khan's prince Toghon (Vietnamese: Thoát Hoan) had to retreat from Thăng Long to northern border. The circumstance of Marquis Hoài Văn's death was not written in Vietnamese accounts but was narrated in the historical book of the Yuan dynasty, the History of Yuan. In the words of "Story of Annam" in History of Yuan, Trần Quốc Toản commanded his troops pursuing the Yuan army along their retreat route. During this period, Đại Việt and the Yuan dynasty had a battle near the Như Nguyệt River (now the Cầu River) where Trần Quốc Toản was appointed to command the troops by the order of Trần Nhân Tông (named Trần Nhật Huyên in the Yuan account) and was ultimately killed in battle. In fact, it is possible that the Yuan dynasty confused Hoài Văn Hầu Trần Quốc Toản with Hoài Nhân Vương Trần Quốc Kiện. The person who was killed in Như Nguyệt River was Hoài Nhân Vương Trần Quốc Kiện, not Hoài Văn Hầu Trần Quốc Toản. Because the battle at Tây Kết then killed Toa Đô, Hoài Văn Hầu Trần Quốc Toản also participated and was also rewarded after the second great victory over Mongolia. Not to mention in Việt Sử Kỷ Yếu of the 3rd Mongol battle, Hoài Văn Hầu Trần Quốc Toản is also recorded as helping Nhân Huệ Vương Trần Khánh Dư fend off the attack of Ô Mã Nhi in Vân Đồn wharf. In the ensuing battle of Bạch Đằng river, Hoài Văn Hầu Trần Quốc Toản also contributed to capturing enemy general Ô Mã Nhi.

After knowing the death of Trần Quốc Toản, the Emperor mourned for the marquis by his own funeral oration and posthumously entitled him as Prince Hoài Văn (Hoài Văn vương).

== Legacy ==
Today, Trần Quốc Toản is still considered as one of the finest examples of Vietnamese patriotism, especially for the young generation. Stories about his spirit and action are taught in schoolbooks of several grades while many streets, schools and gymnasiums in Vietnam are named in honour of this young hero. Trần Quốc Toản is also the main character of several historical novels, including Lá cờ thêu sáu chữ vàng (The flag embroidered with six golden characters) by Nguyễn Huy Tưởng.
