= Mạc Đĩnh Chi =

Vietnamese mandarin and diplomat of Trần dynasty

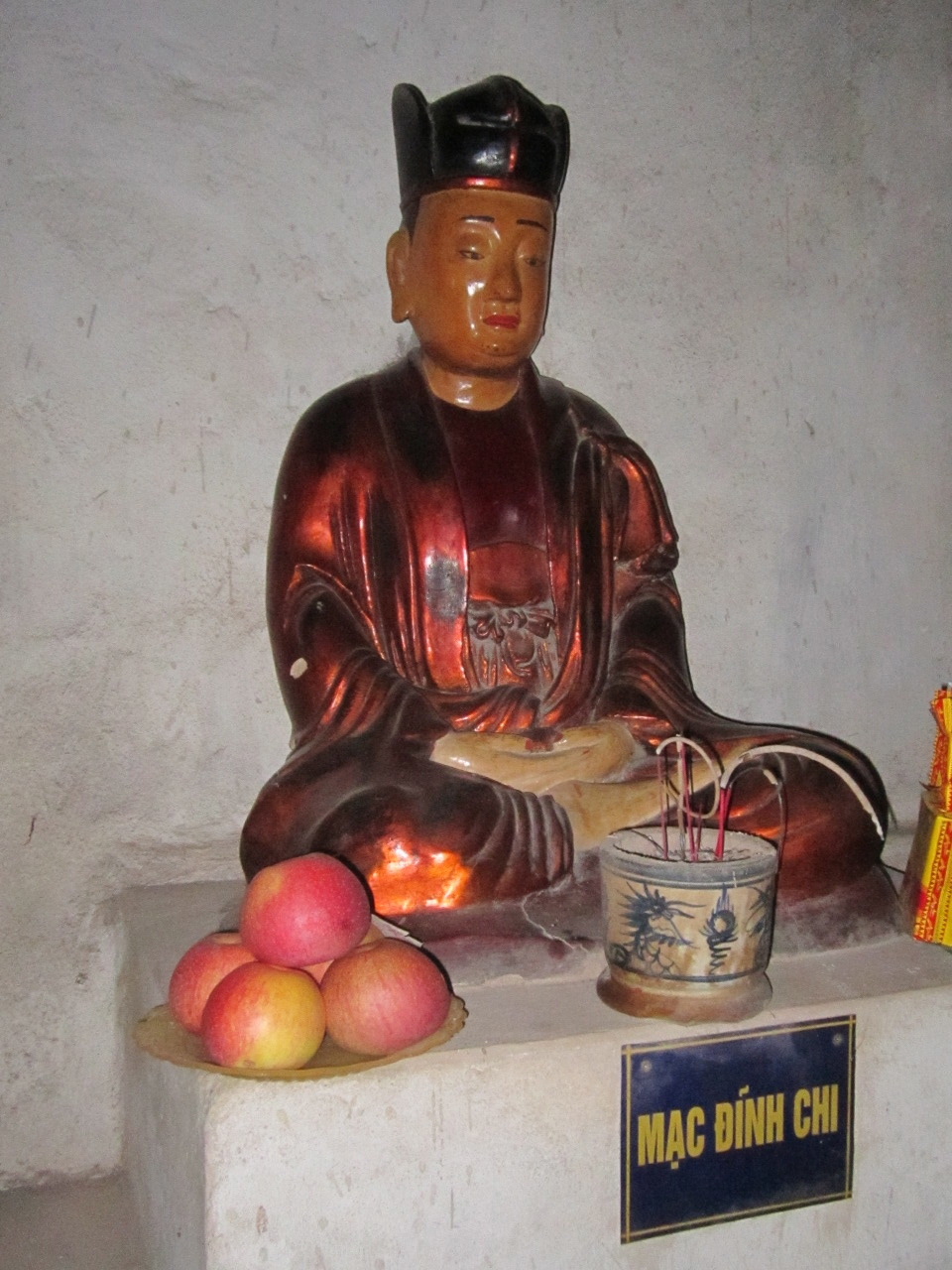
Mạc Đĩnh Chi statue

Mạc Đĩnh Chi (莫挺之; 1272–1346) was a renowned Vietnamese Confucian scholar who was the highest-scoring graduate in the palace examinations at the age of only twenty-four. He served three Trần dynasty emperors—first Trần Anh Tông until 1314, then his son Trần Minh Tông from 1314 to 1319, and finally the grandson Trần Hiến Tông after 1329. Mạc Đĩnh Chi was sent twice as envoy to the Chinese Yuan court. Among the Trân dynasty court scholars, he was almost unique in that his academic degree was recognized by the Chinese. He himself is also the ancestor of the emperors of the Mạc dynasty.

The Mac Dinh Chi Cemetery is named in his honour.
