= Trần Dụ Tông =

Trần Dụ Tông 陳裕宗
- Emperor of Đại Việt
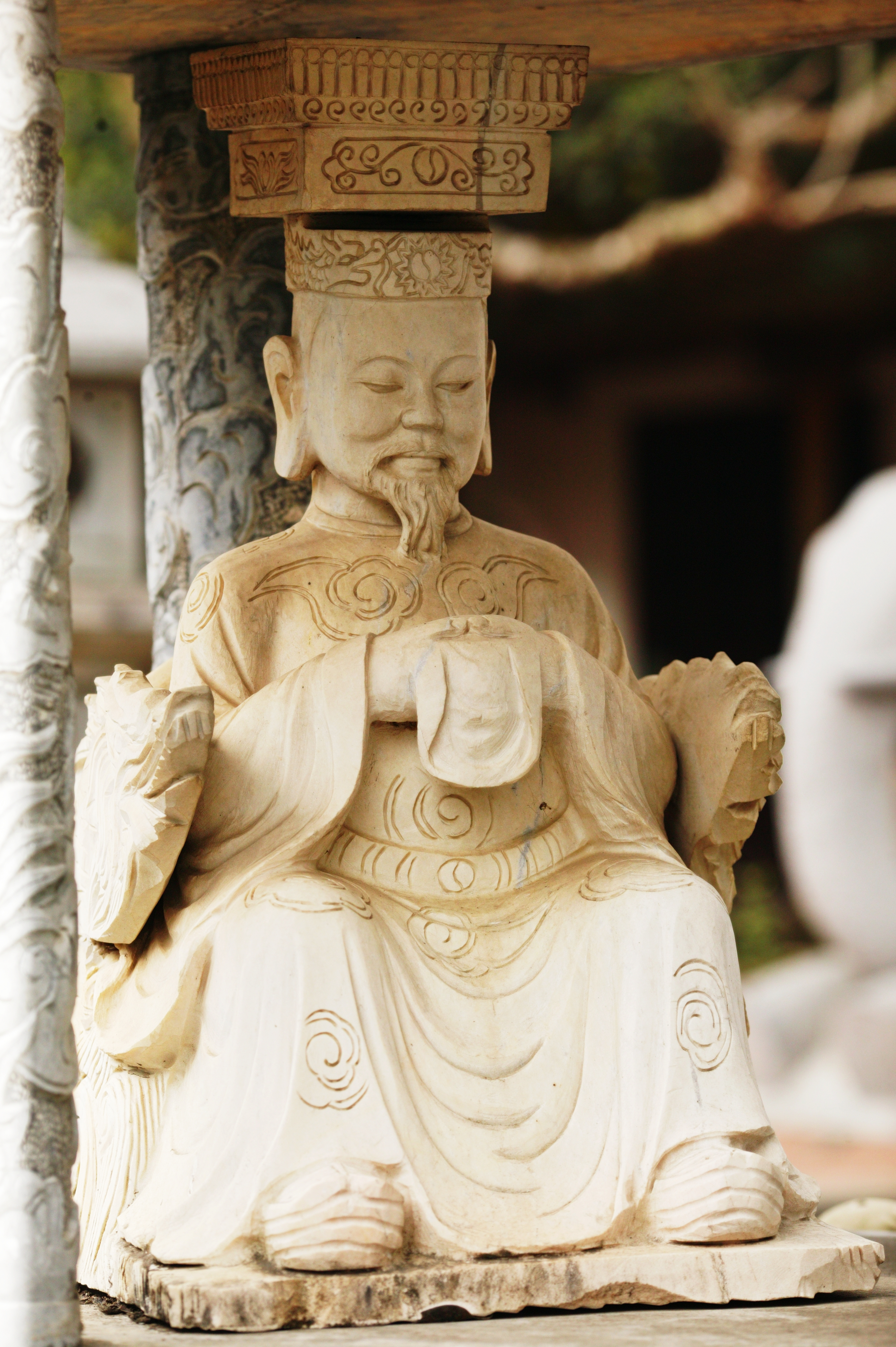
- Statue of emperor Trần Dụ Tông

Emperor of Trần Dynasty
- Reign: 1341–1369
- Predecessor: Trần Hiến Tông
- Successor: Hôn Đức Công
- Born: 22 November 1336; Thăng Long, Đại Việt
- Died: 25 May 1369 (aged 32); Đại Việt
- Burial: Phụ Tomb
- Spouse: Queen Nghi Thánh
- Issue: no heir
Names
- Trần Hạo (陳暭)
Era dates
- Thiệu Phong (紹 豐, 1341–1357); Đại Trị (大 治, 1358–1369)
Posthumous name
- Thống-thiên Thể-đạo Nhơn-minh Quang-hiếu Hoàng đế (統天體道仁明光孝皇帝)
Temple name
- Dụ Tông (裕宗)
- House: Trần Dynasty
- Father: Trần Minh Tông
- Mother: Queen Hiến Từ
- Religion: Buddhism

Trần Dụ Tông (chữ Hán: 陳裕宗, 22 November 1336 – 25 May 1369), given name Trần Hạo (陳暭), was the seventh emperor of the Trần dynasty, and reigned over Vietnam from 1341 to 1369. Enthroned by Senior Emperor Minh Tông after the death of his elder brother Hiến Tông, Dụ Tông nominally ruled Đại Việt under the regency of the Senior Emperor until the latter's death in 1357 and held the absolute position in the royal court for twelve more years. The reign of Dụ Tông was seen by historical books as the starting point for the third phase of Trần Dynasty when the peaceful and prosperous state of the country began to fade away and the royal family fell into a long period of chaos before ultimately collapsing.

== Background ==
Dụ Tông was born in 1336 as Trần Hạo, the tenth son of the Senior Emperor Minh Tông and Queen Hiến Từ. In 1341, the reigning Emperor Hiến Tông died at the age of only 23 without an heir. Trần Hiến Tông was the son of one of Minh Tông's concubines, but he was designated emperor because the official queen of Minh Tông, Hiến Từ, had not given birth to any male child yet. However, by the time of Hiến Tông's death, the Senior Emperor had two sons with the Senior Queen Hiến Từ : Trần Dục (Prince Cung Túc) and Trần Hạo. Hạo was only five years old at that time, but the Senior Emperor passed the throne to him. The reason for this particular decision is that Minh Tông thought that Prince Cung Túc was too extravagant to run the country.

== As emperor ==
=== Thiệu Phong era ===
From 1341 to his death in 1357, the Senior Emperor Minh Tông acted as a regent for his son Dụ Tông, who thus reigned only in name. According to Đại Việt sử ký toàn thư, the young Emperor Dụ Tông was very intelligent and was completely focused on managing both civil and military matters of Đại Việt. For that reason, Dụ Tông in his first era Thiệu Phong (1341–1357) was well respected in the royal court even if it was the Senior Emperor who ruled the country. In 1349 Dụ Tông entitled a daughter of Prince Huệ Túc Trần Đại Niên as his queen, and she became Queen Nghi Thánh. However, historical books recorded that the Emperor was impotent and that he was only cured after many unusual treatments including using medicine made from a killed young boy and incest with Dụ Tông's own sister, princess Thiên Ninh.

In this era, the royal court of Trần Dynasty began to face troubles such as the death of several important and experienced mandarins, the failure of some military campaigns against Lan Xang and Champa and the proliferation of many natural disasters in Đại Việt. For only a short period, Đại Việt suffered many disasters, which caused a time of economic dearth and ignited several revolts against the royal court. A temporary peace was only re-established when Trương Hán Siêu, a capable mandarin, was appointed to restore order in regions affected by unrest.

In 1353, Minh Tong attempted an expedition against the Champa king Tra Hoa Bo De in support of Che Mo's claim to the throne as the son of Che Anan. The expedition was aborted and Che Mo died soon after.

=== Đại Trị era ===
After the death of Minh Tông in 1357, Dụ Tông ascended to the throne and he decided to change the era from Thiệu Phong to Đại Trị (1358–1369). With the death of a capable ruler like Minh Tông, the royal court led by Dụ Tông began to fall into chaos, especially as several able officials such as Nguyễn Trung Ngạn and Trương Hán Siêu died while others such as Chu Văn An became discontented. After the Emperor's refusal of his famous Thất trảm sớ (Petition of beheading seven corrupt officials), Chu Văn An decided to leave the royal court, which was now full of corrupt mandarins and bad cohorts.

At that time, the situation in China was very complicated with the struggle between Zhu Yuanzhang and Chen Youliang, both of whom tried to mobilise support from Đại Việt. However, Dụ Tông maintained a neutral attitude to concentrate his army along the southern border against Champa. Despite his effort, Champa's forces still posed concerns for Đại Việt's border and launched several skirmishes while many revolts were taking place and causing diversions in Đại Việt.

While being modest and diligent under the regency of Minh Tông, the independent reign of Emperor Dụ Tông saw extravagant spending on the building of several luxurious palaces and other pleasurely indulgences. Dụ Tông introduced theatre, which was considered at the time to be a shameful pleasure, in the royal court. Hierarchy and order were completely discarded by the Emperor, and he had the princes and princesses of the royal family do trivial tasks such as folding paper fans in the market. During official audiences, when Dụ Tông felt happy, he would step off the throne to dance with his ministers. One time, the Emperor was so drunk that he fell into a pool of water and caught a disease that was only cured after a long period of treatment. The Emperor died on 25 May of the Lunar calendar, 1369, at the age of 33 following a reign of twenty-eight years. He did not have any posthumous name and was buried in Phụ Tomb.

== Family and succession ==
Dụ Tông had ten wife, Queen Nghi Thánh, who was daughter of the Prince Huệ Túc Trần Đại Niên. Being impotent, Dụ Tông had no son of his own and before his death, he issued an edict that the throne would be passed to Dương Nhật Lễ despite the fact that his appointee was not from Trần clan while the royal family still had several capable princes available for the position. This decision of Dụ Tông was heavily criticized by imperial historians because it broke the normal protocol for succession and heralded the start of a chaotic period of the Trần Dynasty.

== Notes ==
Trần Dụ Tông House of Trần Born: 1336 Died: 1369
Regnal titles
| Preceded by Trần Hiến Tông | Emperor of Đại Việt; 1341–1369 | Succeeded by Hôn Đức Công |
| Preceded by Trần Hiến Tông | Emperor of Trần Dynasty; 1341–1369 | Succeeded by Trần Nghệ Tông |
