= Trần dynasty =

Imperial Vietnamese dynasty (1225–1400)

Coordinates: 21°02′15″N 105°50′19″E

Đại Việt Quốc 大越國
- 1225–1400
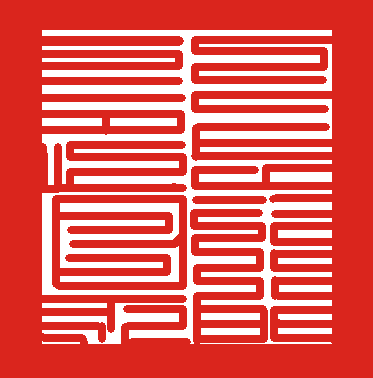
- Imperial seal

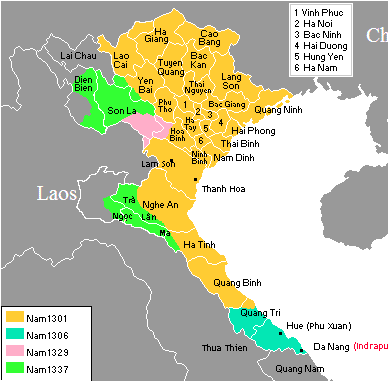
- The expansion of Đại Việt. Trần dynasty from 1301 to 1337.

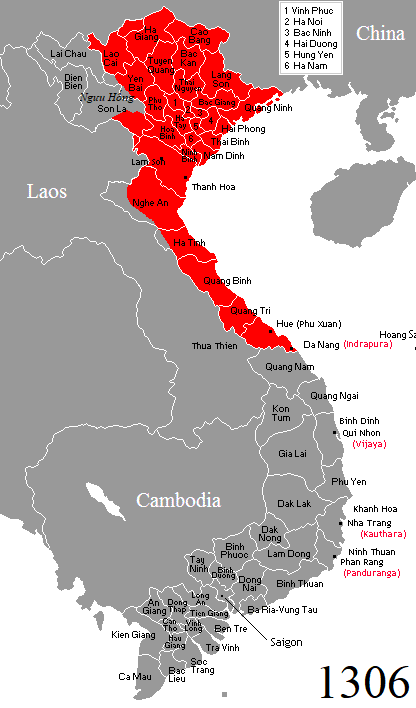
- The territory of Đại Việt in 1306 after the marriage of Vietnamese princess Huyền Trân and Cham king Jaya Simhavarman III. The province of O (Cham: Vuyar) and Ly (Cham: Ulik) was ceded to Đại Việt as dowry.
- Status: Internal imperial system within Chinese tributary (Song 1225–1258) (Yuan 1258–1368) (Ming 1368–1400)
- Capital: Thăng Long (1225–1397); Thanh Hóa (temp) (1397–1400)
- Official languages: Literary Chinese (Note: The use of the Classical Chinese language in documents and correspondences is distinct from the use of the Chữ Nôm writing system for the Vietnamese language.) (written)
- Common languages: Old Vietnamese
- Religion: Buddhism (official), Taoism, Confucianism, Vietnamese folk religion
- Government: Monarchy
- Emperor
  - 1226–1258: Trần Thái Tông (first)
  - 1258–1278: Trần Thánh Tông
  - 1278–1293: Trần Nhân Tông
  - 1293–1314: Trần Anh Tông
  - 1398–1400: Trần Thiếu Đế (last)
- Chancellor
  - 1225: Trần Thủ Độ (first)
  - ?: Trần Quốc Toản
  - ?: Trần Khánh Dư
  - ?: Trần Quang Khải
  - 1387: Hồ Quý Ly (last)
- Historical era: Postclassical Era
  - Coronation of Trần Cảnh: January 10 1225
  - Regent of Trần Thừa and Trần Thủ Độ: 1226
  - Mongol invasions of Vietnam: 1258, 1285 and 1287–88
  - Coup overthrown of Dương Nhật Lễ: 1370
  - Trần Thiếu Đế ceded the throne to Hồ Quý Ly: March 23 1400
- Currency: Copper-alloy cash coins
Preceded by	Succeeded by
Lý dynasty	Hồ dynasty
- Today part of: Vietnam; China; Laos

Trần
- Country: State of Đại Việt (Vietnam)
- Founded: 12th century
- Founder: Trần Nhật Cảnh
- Final ruler: Trần Quý Khoáng
- Titles: Emperor of Đại Việt / King of Annam
- Estates: Thăng Long and Thiên Trường
- Deposition: 1400

The Trần dynasty (Vietnamese: Nhà Trần, chữ Nôm: 茹陳; Vietnamese: triều Trần, chữ Hán: 朝陳, Chinese characters: 陳朝) was a Vietnamese dynasty that ruled Đại Việt (Chữ Hán: 大越) from 1225 to 1400. The dynasty was founded when emperor Trần Thái Tông ascended to the throne after his uncle Trần Thủ Độ orchestrated the overthrow of the Lý dynasty. The Trần dynasty defeated three Mongol invasions, most notably during the decisive Battle of Bạch Đằng River in 1288. During its final decades, several succession crises and invasions from Champa severely weakened the dynasty. In 1398, emperor Trần Thuận Tông was forced to cede the throne to his three-year-old son Thiếu Đế, who in turn was forced to abdicate in 1400 in favor of the minister Hồ Quý Ly.

The Trần improved Chinese gunpowder, enabling them to expand southward to defeat and vassalize the Champa. They also started using paper money for the first time in Vietnam. The period was considered a golden age in Vietnamese language, arts, and culture. The first pieces of Chữ Nôm literature were written during this period, while the introduction of vernacular Vietnamese into the court was established, alongside Literary Chinese. This laid the foundation for the further development and solidifying of the Vietnamese language and identity.

== History ==
=== Origin and foundation ===
The ancestor of the Trần clan, Trần Kinh, (陳京) migrated from the modern province of Fujian to Đại Việt during the early 12th century. He settled in Tức Mặc village (now Nam Định, Ninh Bình province) and lived by fishing. His grandson Trần Lý (陳李; 1151–1210) became a wealthy landowner in the area. Trần Lý's grandson, Trần Cảnh, later established the Trần dynasty. From Trần Lý onwards, the Trần clan became related to the Lý clan by intermarriages with several members of the imperial Lý dynasty.

During the troubled time of many regional rebellions under the reign of emperor Lý Cao Tông, the imperial crown prince, Lý Sảm sought refuge in the territory of the Trần clan, headed by Trần Lý. During this time, the crown prince decided to marry Trấn Lý's daughter Trần Thị Dung in 1209. Afterward, it was the Trần clan who helped emperor Lý Cao Tông and crown prince Lý Sảm to restore their power and return to capital Thăng Long. As a result, the emperor appointed several members of the Trần clan to key positions in the imperial court, such as Tô Trung Từ, who was an uncle of Trần Thị Dung, and Trần Tự Khánh and Trần Thừa, who were all Trần Lý's sons. In 1211 the crown prince Lý Sảm was enthroned as Lý Huệ Tông after the death of Lý Cao Tông. By that time the Trần clan's position began to rise within the imperial court.

After a period of political crisis, the Emperor Lý Huệ Tông, who had been mentally ill for a long time, ultimately decided to pass the throne of the Lý dynasty to crown princess Lý Chiêu Hoàng in October of the lunar calendar, 1224. Ascending the throne at the age of only six, Lý Chiêu Hoàng ruled under the dominant influence of the commander of the imperial guard, Trần Thủ Độ. Even the Empress Regnant's servants were chosen by Trần Thủ Độ; one of them was his 7-year-old nephew Trần Cảnh.

When Trần Cảnh informed Trần Thủ Độ that the Empress Regnant seemed to have affection towards him, the leader of the Trần clan immediately decided to take this chance to carry out his plot to overthrow the Lý dynasty and establish a new dynasty ruled by his own clan. First Trần Thủ Độ moved the whole Trần clan to the imperial palace and arranged a secret marriage between Lý Chiêu Hoàng and Trần Cảnh there, without the appearance of any mandarin or member of the Lý imperial family. After that, he announced the fait accompli to the imperial court and made Lý Chiêu Hoàng cede the throne to her new husband on the grounds that she was incapable of holding office. Thus Trần Cảnh was chosen as her successor. As a result, the 216-year reign of the Lý dynasty was ended, and the new Trần dynasty was created on the first day of the twelfth lunar month (Gregorian: December 31) 1225.

=== Early Trần ===
After the collapse of the Lý Dynasty, Trần Thủ Độ was still afraid that the newly established Trần Dynasty might be overthrown by its political opponents. He therefore continued to eliminate members of the Lý imperial family: first the former emperor Lý Huệ Tông was coerced into suicide in the tenth lunar month of 1226, then other members of the Lý imperial family were massacred by the order of Trần Thủ Độ in the eighth lunar month of 1232.

Trần Thái Tông was enthroned when he was only eight years old. There were several rebellions in Đại Việt at that time, so Trần Thủ Độ had to devote all of his efforts to consolidating the rule of Thái Tông in the imperial court and over the country. Right after the coronation of the Emperor in 1226, Nguyễn Nộn and Đoàn Thượng rose in revolt in the mountainous region of Bắc Giang and Hải Dương. By both military and diplomatic measures, such as sending an army and by awarding two leaders of the revolt the title of Prince (Vương), Trần Thủ Độ was able to put down these revolts in 1229.

According to Đại Việt sử ký toàn thư, Thái Tông and his wife, the Empress Chiêu Thánh, did not have their first son for some time. This situation worried the grand chancellor Trần Thủ Độ because he had profited from similar circumstances with the Emperor Lý Huệ Tông in overthrowing the Lý dynasty. Therefore, in 1237 Trần Thủ Độ decided to force Prince Hoài Trần Liễu, Thái Tông's elder brother, to give up his wife, Princess Thuận Thiên, for the Emperor when she had been pregnant with Trần Quốc Khang for three months. After the marriage, Thuận Thiên was entitled the new empress of the Trần dynasty, while Chiêu Thánh was downgraded to princess.

Furious at losing his pregnant wife to his brother, Trần Liễu rose in revolt against the imperial family. Meanwhile, Thái Tông felt remorse about the situation and decided to become a monk at Yên Tử Mountain in Quảng Ninh in order to avoid the family feud. Finally Trần Thủ Độ forcefully yet successfully persuaded Thái Tông to return to the throne, and Trần Liễu had to surrender after judging that he could not stand with his fragile force. All soldiers who participated in this revolt were killed; Trần Thủ Độ even wanted to behead Trần Liễu, but was stopped by Thái Tông.

=== Mongol invasions ===
In 1257, the first Mongol invasion of Đại Việt was launched with the purpose of opening a southern front against the Song dynasty, whom they were fighting for more than two decades. The Mongols had already conquered parts of modern-day Sichuan and the Dali kingdom in modern-day Yunnan in order to besiege the Southern Song from the west. Trần Thái Tông opposed the encroachment of a foreign army across his territory and so dispatched soldiers on elephants to deter the Mongol troops. The elephant-mounted troops were routed by sharpshooters targeting the elephants. In comparison with the previous Ly dynasty, the Tran had strengthened their armed forces and were able to deter the Mongol attacks.

At the beginning of the war, the Đại Việt army suffered several defeats at the hands of an overwhelming force that had already conquered a vast area in Asia. Several high-ranking officials of the Trần dynasty were so fearful that Prince Trần Nhật Hiệu, the younger brother of Thái Tông, even suggested to the Emperor that they might escape from Đại Việt to the Song dynasty.

Trần Thái Tông submitted to the Mongols after the loss of a prince and the capital. In 1258, the Trần commenced regular diplomatic relations and a tributary relationship with the Mongol court, treating them as equals to the embattled Southern Song dynasty without renouncing their ties to the Song.

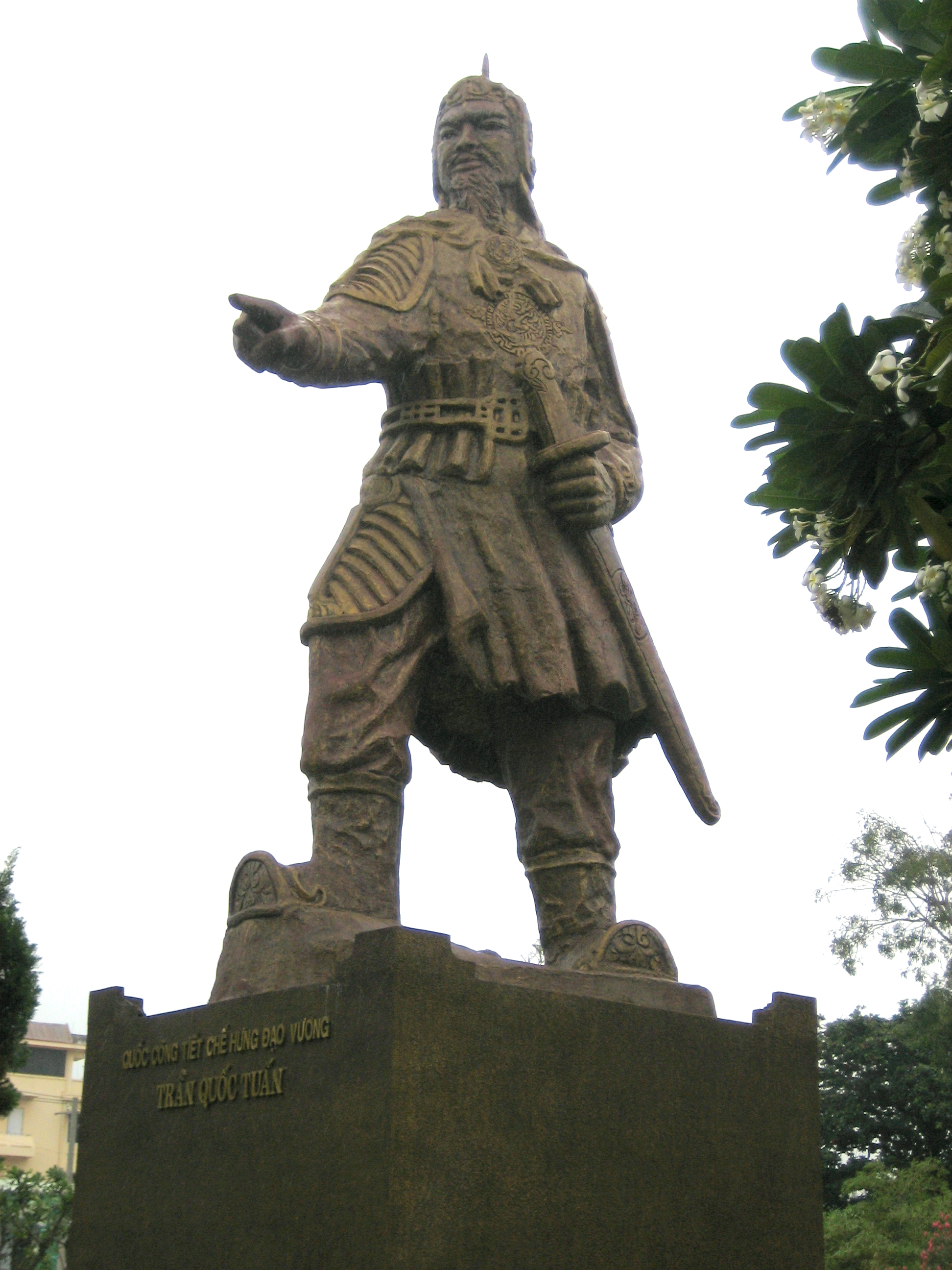
Statue of noble admiral Trần Quốc Tuấn

Kublai Khan was dissatisfied with the arrangement at the end of the first invasion and requested greater tributary payments, including taxes to the Mongols in both money and labor, "incense, gold, silver, cinnabar, agarwood, sandalwood, ivory, tortoiseshell, pearls, rhinoceros horn, silk floss, and porcelain cups", and direct oversight from a Mongol-appointed darughachi. In 1283, Khubilai Khan sent word to the Trần that he intended to send Yuan armies through Trần territory to attack the kingdom of Champa, with demands for provisions and other support to the Yuan army.

In the twelfth lunar month of 1284, the second Yuan invasion of Đại Việt was launched under the command of Kublai Khan's prince Toghon. Đại Việt was attacked from two directions, with Toghan himself conducting an infantry invasion from the northern border while the Yuan navy under general Sogetu advanced from the southern border through the territory of Champa.

Initially, Trần Thánh Tông and Trần Nhân Tông had to order the army to retreat to avoid the pressure from the Yuan force when Prince Chiêu Minh Trần Quang Khải commanded his troops to stop Sogetu's fleet in the province of Nghệ An. Meanwhile, several high-ranking officials and members of the imperial family of the Trần dynasty defected to the Yuan side, including Thánh Tông's own brother, Prince Chiêu Quốc (Trần Ích Tắc), and Trần Kiện, who was the son of Prince Tĩnh Quốc (Trần Quốc Khang). To ensure the safety of Thánh Tông and Nhân Tông during their retreat, Princess An Tư was offered as a present and diversion for Prince Toghan, while Marquis Bảo Nghĩa (Trần Bình Trọng) was captured and later killed in the Battle of Đà Mạc defending the two emperors. The mass defections were the result of the significant effect that recent Mongol conquest of the Southern Song had on contemporary observers, with a Mongol conquest of Vietnam appearing inevitable to many.

At the southern border, Trần Quang Khải also had to retreat under the pressure of Sogetu's navy and the defection of the governor of Nghe An. This critical situation for the Trần dynasty began to change after the Toghan made the decision to retreat with the forward troops their victory in the fourth lunar month of 1285 at the Battle of Hàm Tử, where the troops commanded by Trần Nhật Duật, Prince Chiêu Thành, Trần Quốc Toản, and Nguyễn Khoái were finally able to defeat the fleet of general Sogetu. On the tenth day of the fifth lunar month of 1285, Trần Quang Khải fought the decisive battle in the Chương Dương, where the Yuan navy was almost destroyed and the balance in the battlefield tilted definitively in favor of the Trần dynasty. Ten days later Sogetu was killed and the Trần Emperor Nhân Tông and Emperor Emeritus Thánh Tông returned to the capital, Thăng Long, on the sixth day of the sixth lunar month, 1285.

In the third lunar month of 1287, the Yuan dynasty launched their third invasion of Đại Việt. This time, unlike the second invasion, commander-in-chief Prince Hưng Đạo (Trần Quốc Tuấn) assured the Emperor that Đại Việt's army could easily break the Yuan military campaign. After occupying and looting the capital, Toghan decided to retreat with the forward troops. This invasion was indeed ended one year later by a disastrous defeat of the Yuan navy at the Battle of Bạch Đằng on the eighth day of the third lunar month, 1288. Besides Trần Quốc Tuấn, other notable generals of the Trần dynasty during this time were Prince Nhân Huệ Trần Khánh Dư, who destroyed the logistics convoy of the Yuan navy at the Battle of Vân Đồn, and general Phạm Ngũ Lão, who took charge of ambushing prince Toghan's retreating troops. After the destruction of the Mongol navy, both the Đại Việt and Champa decided to accept the nominal supremacy of the Yuan dynasty and serve as tributary states in order to avoid further conflicts.

Professor Liam Kelley noted that people from Song dynasty China, such as Zhao Zhong and Xu Zongdao, fled to the Tran dynasty after the Mongol invasion of the Song and helped the Tran fight against the Mongol invasion. Like the Tran dynasty, the Daoist cleric Xu Zongdao originated from Fujian. He recorded the Mongol invasion and referred to the Mongols as "Northern bandits".

Nguyễn Trung Ngạn, head of an envoy mission to the Yuan court in 1314, referred to the Yuan dynasty as Hồ (胡), meaning barbarians, in his poem Bắc sứ túc Khâu Ôn dịch (北使宿丘溫驛):

江山有限分南北，
The land is divided into North and South
胡越同風各弟兄。
"Hồ" and Viet are brothers with same customs

Later on, Wu Bozong 吳伯宗 (b. 1334-d. 1384) was sent as Ming ambassador to Vietnam. Wu wrote in the Rongjinji (榮進集) that when he asked the Tran monarch about Annam's affairs, the Tran ruler said that the kingdom still adhered to Tang dynasty and Han dynasty customs.

欲問安南事，
Asking about Annam situation?
安南風俗淳。
Annam customs are traditional
衣冠唐制度，
Clothing are Tang's standard
禮樂漢君臣
Music and Rites are similar to Han's court

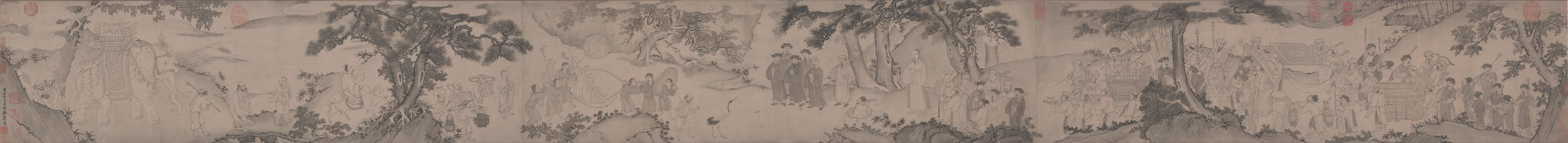
The handscroll "The Mahasattva of Truc Lam comes out of the mountains" depicts the arrival of Thái thượng hoàng Trần Nhân Tông in the outskirt of Thăng Long from his hermitage in Vũ Lâm.

=== Peace and southward expansion ===
After the Mongol invasions, king Trần Nhân Tông led an attack into modern-day Laos in the winter of 1289–1290 against the advice of his advisors with the goal of preventing raids from the inhabitants of the highlands. Famines and starvations ravaged the country from 1290 to 1292. There were no records of what caused the crop failures, but possible factors included neglect of the water control system due to the war, the mobilization of men away from the rice fields, and floods or drought.

There was a relatively long period of prosperity and peace during the reigns of Trần Anh Tông, Trần Minh Tông, and Trần Hiến Tông. Anh Tông was the first Trần emperor to reign without facing attacks from the Mongol Empire. Despite the deaths of the two most important generals of the early Trần dynasty, Trần Quang Khải in 1294 and Trần Quốc Tuấn in 1300, the Emperor was still served by many efficient mandarins like Trần Nhật Duật, Đoàn Nhữ Hài, Phạm Ngũ Lão, Trương Hán Siêu, Mạc Đĩnh Chi, and Nguyễn Trung Ngạn. Anh Tông was very strict in suppressing gambling and corruption, but he also generously rewarded those who served him well.

In 1306, the king of Champa, Chế Mân, offered Vietnam two Cham prefectures, Ô and Lý, in exchange for a marriage with the Vietnamese princess Huyền Trân. Anh Tông accepted this offer, then took and renamed Ô prefecture and Lý prefecture as Thuận prefecture and Hóa prefecture. These two prefectures soon began to be referred to collectively as the Thuận Hóa region. Only one year into the marriage, Chế Mân died and, in line with the royal tradition of Champa, Huyền Trân was to be cremated with her husband. Facing this urgent condition, Anh Tông sent his mandarin Trần Khắc Chung to Champa to save Huyền Trân from an imminent death.

Finally Huyền Trân was able to return to Đại Việt, but Chế Chí, the successor of Chế Mân, no longer wished to abide by the peace treaty with Đại Việt. After that event, Anh Tông himself, along with the generals Trần Quốc Chân and Trần Khánh Dư, commanded three groups of Đại Việt military units to attack Champa in 1312. Chế Chí was defeated and captured in this invasion, and Anh Tông installed a hand-picked successor, but the relations between Đại Việt and Champa remained strained for a long time afterwards.

=== Champa invasions and decline ===
After the death of the retired Emperor Trần Minh Tông in 1357, the Trần dynasty began to fall into chaos during the reign of Trần Dụ Tông. While being modest and diligent under the regency of Minh Tông, the reign of Emperor Dụ Tông saw extravagant spending on the building of several luxurious palaces and other indulgences. Dụ Tông introduced theatre, which was considered at the time to be a shameful pleasure, into the imperial court. The Emperor died on the 25th day of the fifth lunar month, 1369, at the age of 28, after appointing his brother's son Dương Nhật Lễ despite the fact that his appointee was not from the Trần clan.

Like his predecessor Dụ Tông, Nhật Lễ neglected his administrative duties and concentrated only on drinking, theatre, and wandering. He even wanted to change his family name back to Dương. Such activities disappointed everyone in the imperial court. This prompted the Prime Minister Trần Nguyên Trác and his son Trần Nguyên Tiết to plot the assassination of Nhật Lễ, but their conspiracy was discovered by the Emperor and they were killed afterwards.

In the tenth lunar month of 1370, the Emperor's father-in-law, Trần Phủ, after receiving advice from several mandarins and members of the imperial family, decided to raise an army for the purpose of overthrowing Nhật Lễ. After one month, his plan succeeded and Trần Phủ became the new emperor of Đại Việt, ruling as Trần Nghệ Tông, while Nhật Lễ was downgraded to Duke of Hôn Đức (Hôn Đức Công) and was killed afterwards by an order of Nghệ Tông.

After the death of Hôn Đức Công, his mother fled to Champa and begged King Chế Bồng Nga to attack Đại Việt. Taking advantage of his neighbour's lack of political stability, Chế Bồng Nga commanded troops and directly assaulted Thăng Long, the capital of Đại Việt. The Trần army could not withstand this attack and the Trần imperial court had to escape from Thăng Long, creating an opportunity for Chế Bồng Nga to violently loot the capital before withdrawing.

In the twelfth lunar month of 1376 the Emperor Trần Duệ Tông decided to personally command a military campaign against Champa. Eventually, the campaign was ended by a disastrous defeat of Đại Việt's army at the Battle of Đồ Bàn, when the Emperor himself, along with many high-ranking mandarins and generals of the Trần dynasty, were killed by the Cham forces. The successor of Duệ Tông, Trần Phế Đế, and the retired Emperor Nghệ Tông, were unable to drive back any invasion of Chế Bồng Nga in Đại Việt. As a result, Nghệ Tông even decided to hide money in Lạng Sơn, fearing that Chế Bồng Nga's troops might assault and destroy the imperial palace in Thăng Long. In 1389 general Trần Khát Chân was appointed by Nghệ Tông to take charge of stopping Champa. In the first lunar month of 1390, Trần Khát Chân had a decisive victory over Champa which resulted in the death of Chế Bồng Nga and stabilised situation in the southern part of Đại Việt.

=== Downfall ===
During the reign of Trần Nghệ Tông, Hồ Quý Ly, an official who had two aunts entitled as consorts of Minh Tông, was appointed to one of the highest positions in the imperial court. Despite his complicity in the death of the Emperor Duệ Tông, Hồ Quý Ly still had Nghệ Tông's confidence and came to hold more and more power at the imperial court. Facing the unstoppable rise of Hồ Quý Ly in the court, the Emperor Trần Phế Đế plotted with minister Trần Ngạc to reduce Hồ Quý Ly's power, but Hồ Quý Ly pre-empted this plot by a defamation campaign against the Emperor which ultimately made Nghệ Tông decide to replace him by Trần Thuận Tông and downgrade Phế Đế to Prince Linh Đức in December 1388. Trần Nghệ Tông died on the 15th day of the twelfth lunar month, 1394 at the age of 73 leaving the imperial court in the total control of Hồ Quý Ly. He began to reform the administrative and examination systems of the Trần dynasty and eventually obliged Thuận Tông to change the capital from Thăng Long to Thanh Hóa in January 1397.

On the full moon of the third lunar month, 1398, under pressure from Hồ Quý Ly, Thuận Tông, had to cede the throne to his three-year-old son Trần An, now Trần Thiếu Đế, and held the title Retired Emperor at the age of only 20. Only one year after his resignation, Thuận Tông was killed on the orders of Hồ Quý Ly. Hồ Quý Ly also authorised the execution of over 370 persons who opposed his dominance in the imperial court, including several prominent mandarins and the Emperor's relatives together with their families, such as Trần Khát Chân, Trần Hãng, Phạm Khả Vĩnh and Lương Nguyên Bưu. The end of the Trần dynasty came on the 28th day of the second lunar month (Gregorian: March 23) 1400, when Hồ Quý Ly decided to overthrow Thiếu Đế and established a new dynasty, the Hồ dynasty. Being Hồ Quý Ly's own grandson, Thiếu Đế was downgraded to Prince Bảo Ninh instead of being killed like his father. Hồ Quý Ly claimed descent from Duke Hu of Chen (Trần Hồ công, 陳胡公), whose Hồ clan originated in State of Chen (modern day Zhejiang, China) around the 940s.

=== Later Trần ===
After the Ming dynasty conquered the Hồ dynasty in 1407, Prince Trần Ngỗi was declared emperor and led the Trần loyalists forces against the Chinese. His base was first centered in Ninh Bình Province. He defeated the Ming forces in 1408 but failed to retake Đông Quan (Hanoi). Due to internal purges, his offensive eventually failed and he had to retreat to Nghệ An. A new emperor, Trùng Quang Đế, was installed by the generals in 1409. The Later Trần held the southern provinces before being defeated by Ming forces in 1413.

== Economy and society ==
To restore the country's economy, which had been heavily damaged during the turbulent time at the end of the Lý dynasty, Emperor Trần Thái Tông decided to reform the nation's system of taxation by introducing a new personal tax (thuế thân), which was levied on each person according to the area of cultivated land owned. For example, a farmer who owned one or two mẫu, equal to 3,600 to 7,200 square metres (39,000 to 78,000 sq ft), had to pay one quan per year, while another with up to four mẫus had to pay two quan. Besides personal taxes, farmers were obliged to pay a land tax in measures of rice that was calculated by land classification. One historical book reveals that the Trần dynasty taxed everything from fish and fruits to betel. Taxpayers were divided into three categories: minors (tiểu hoàng nam, from 18 to 20), adults (đại hoàng nam, from 20 to 60), and seniors (lão hạng, over 60).

Manufactured items such as handicrafts, cotton, silk and brocades saw rapid development in this period. Some of these items were exported to China while silver, gold, tin and lead mining increased jewelry-making. State-minted copper coins were set up by the Tran authorities, so were weapons workshops, court attire workshops and utilities for bronze smelting. Education and literature were largely aided from improvements in the technology of printing and engraved wooden plates.

The shipbuilding industry expanded where large 100-oar junks were produced. Thang Long then became the state's commercial center with numerous markets established. A 13th-century Mongolian ambassador mentioned that markets were held twice a month, with "plenty of goods", and a market was situated every five miles on the state highway. Inns were also established by the state during the period.

During the reign of Trần Thánh Tông members of the Trần clan and imperial family were required by the Emperor to take full advantage of their land grants by hiring the poor to cultivate them. Đại Việt's cultivated land was annually ruined by river floods, so for a more stable agriculture, in 1244 Trần Thái Tông ordered his subordinates to construct a new system of levees along the Red River. Farmers who had to sacrifice their land for the diking were compensated with the value of the land. The Emperor also appointed a separate official to control the system.

Towards the end of the Trần dynasty, Hồ Quý Ly held absolute power in the imperial court, and he began to carry out his ideas for reforming the economy of Đại Việt. The most significant change during this time was the replacement of copper coins with paper money in 1396. It was the first time in the history of Vietnam that paper money was used in trading. The Emperor set up trading posts at the coastal town of Vân Đồn, where Chinese merchants from Guangdong and Fujian would move in to engage in commerce. Ethnic Chinese are recorded in Tran and Ly dynasty records of officials.

== Culture ==
=== Literature ===
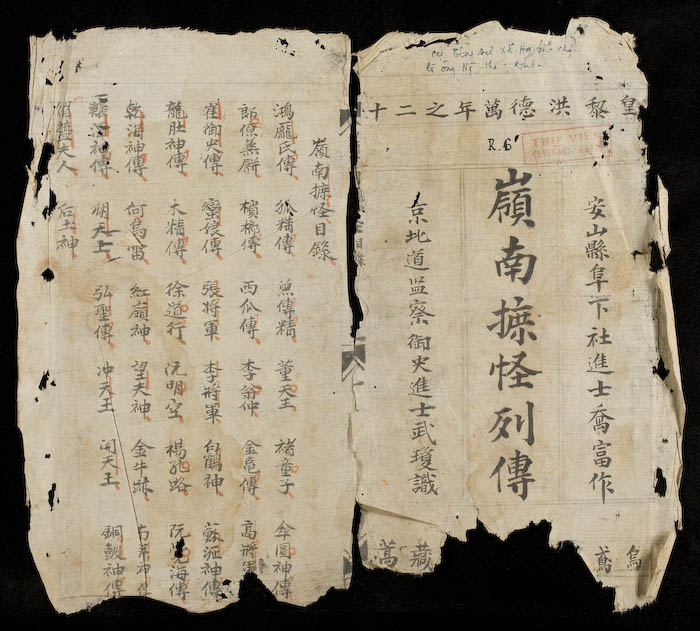
Lĩnh Nam chích quái,14th-century Vietnamese historical work written in Han scripts by Trần Thế Pháp.

Trần literature is considered superior to Lý literature in both quality and quantity. Initially, most members of the Trần clan were fishermen without any depth of knowledge. For example, Trần Thủ Độ, the founder of the Trần dynasty, was described in Đại Việt sử ký toàn thư as a man of superficial learning. However, after their usurpation of power from the Lý dynasty, Trần emperors and other princes and marquises always attached special importance to culture, especially literature.

Two important schools of literature during the reign of the Trần dynasty were patriotic and Buddhist literature. To commemorate the victory of Đại Việt against the second Mongol invasion the grand chancellor Trần Quang Khải composed a poem, named Tòng Giá Hoàn Kinh (Return to the capital), which was considered one of the finest examples of Vietnamese patriotic literature during the dynastic era. Patriotism in Trần literature was also represented by the proclamation Hịch tướng sĩ (Call of Soldiers), written by general Trần Quốc Tuấn, which was the most popular work of the hịch (appeal, call) form in Vietnamese literature.

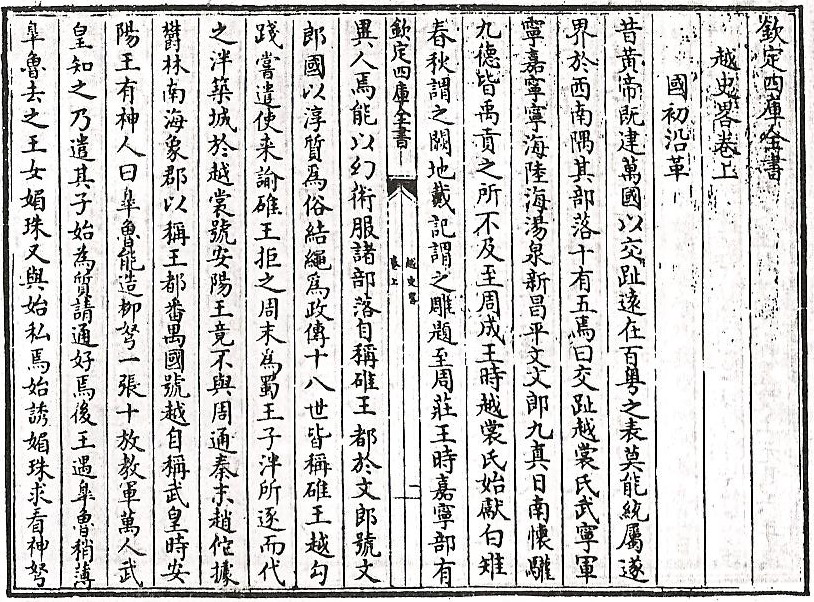
(Đại Việt sử lược) History of Vietnam record .

Besides members of the Trần clan, there were several mandarins and scholars who were well known for patriotic works such as Trương Hán Siêu, an eminent author of the phú form, or general Phạm Ngũ Lão with his famous poem Thuật hoài. As Buddhism was de facto the national religion of the Trần dynasty, there were many works of Trần literature that expressed the spirit of Buddhism and Zen, notably the works of the Emperor Trần Nhân Tông and other masters of Trúc Lâm School.

`Besides the literature created by the upper classes, folk narratives of myths, legends, and ghost stories were also collected in Việt Điện U Linh Tập by Lý Tế Xuyên and Lĩnh Nam chích quái by Trần Thế Pháp. These two collections held great value not only for folk culture but also for the early history of Vietnam.

Trần literature had a special role in the history of Vietnamese literature for its introduction and development of the Vietnamese language (Quốc ngữ) written in chữ nôm. Before the Trần dynasty, Vietnamese was only used in oral history or proverbs. Under the rule of the Emperor Trần Nhân Tông, it was used for the first time as the second language in official scripts of the imperial court, besides Chinese.

It was Hàn Thuyên, an official of Nhân Tông, who began to compose his literary works in the Vietnamese language, with the earliest recorded poem written in chữ Nôm in 1282. He was considered the pioneer who introduced chữ nôm in literature. After Hàn Thuyên, chữ Nôm was progressively used by Trần scholars in composing Vietnamese literature, such as Chu Văn An with the collection Quốc ngữ thi tập (Collection of national language poems) or Hồ Quý Ly who wrote Quốc ngữ thi nghĩa to explain Shi Jing in the Vietnamese language. The achievement of Vietnamese language literature during the Trần era was the essential basis for the development of this language and the subsequent literature of Vietnam.

=== Performing arts ===
The Trần dynasty was considered a golden age for music and culture. Although it was still seen as a shameful pleasure at that time, theatre rapidly developed towards the end of the Trần dynasty with the role of Lý Nguyên Cát (Li Yuan Ki), a captured Chinese soldier who was granted a pardon for his talent in theatre. Lý Nguyên Cát imported many features of Chinese theatre (also see 话剧) in the performing arts of Đại Việt such as stories, costumes, roles, and acrobatics. For that reason, Lý Nguyên Cát was traditionally considered the founder of the art of hát tuồng in Vietnam. However this is nowadays a challenged hypothesis because hát tuồng and Beijing opera differed in the way of using painted faces, costumes, or theatrical conventions. The art of theatre was introduced to the imperial court by Trần Dụ Tông and eventually the emperor even decided to cede the throne to Dương Nhật Lễ, who was born to a couple of hát tuồng performers.

To celebrate the victory over the 1288 Mongol invasion, Trần Quang Khải and Trần Nhật Duật created the Múa bài bông (dance of flowers) for a major three-day festival in Thăng Long. This dance has been handed down to the present and is still performed at local festivals in the northern region.

== Education and imperial examination system ==
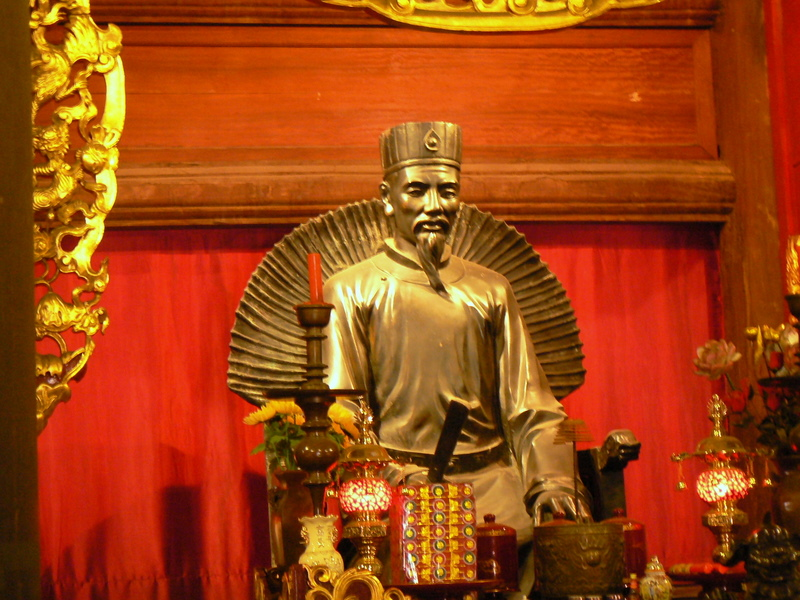
Statue of noble professor Chu Văn An who was the imperial professor of Tran dynasty in Dai-Viet

Although Buddhism was considered the national religion of the Trần dynasty, Confucianist education began to spread across the country. The principal curricula during this time were the Four Books and Five Classics, and Northern history, which were at the beginning taught only at Buddhist pagodas and gradually brought to pupils in private classes organized by retired officials or Confucian scholars.

The most famous teacher of the Trần dynasty was probably Chu Văn An, an official in the imperial court from the reign of Trần Minh Tông to the reign of Trần Dụ Tông, who also served as imperial professor of Crown Prince Trần Vượng. During the reign of Trần Thánh Tông, the emperor also permitted his brother Trần Ích Tắc, a prince who was well known for his intelligence and knowledge, to open his own school at the prince's palace. Several prominent mandarins of the future imperial court such as Mạc Đĩnh Chi and Bùi Phóng were trained at this school.

The official school of the Trần dynasty, Quốc học viện, was established in June 1253 to teach the Four Books and Five Classics to imperial students (thái học sinh). The military school, Giảng võ đường, which focused on teaching about war and military manoeuvre, was opened in August of the same year. Together with this military school, the first Temple of Military Men (Võ miếu) was built in Thăng Long to worship Jiang Ziya and other famous generals.

Seven years after the establishment of the Trần dynasty, the Emperor Trần Thái Tông ordered the first imperial examination, in the second lunar month of 1232, for imperial students with the purpose of choosing the best scholars in Đại Việt for numerous high-ranking positions in the imperial court. Two of the top candidates in this examination were Trương Hanh and Lưu Diễm. After another imperial examination in 1239, the Trần emperor began to establish the system of seven-year periodic examinations in order to select imperial students from all over the country.

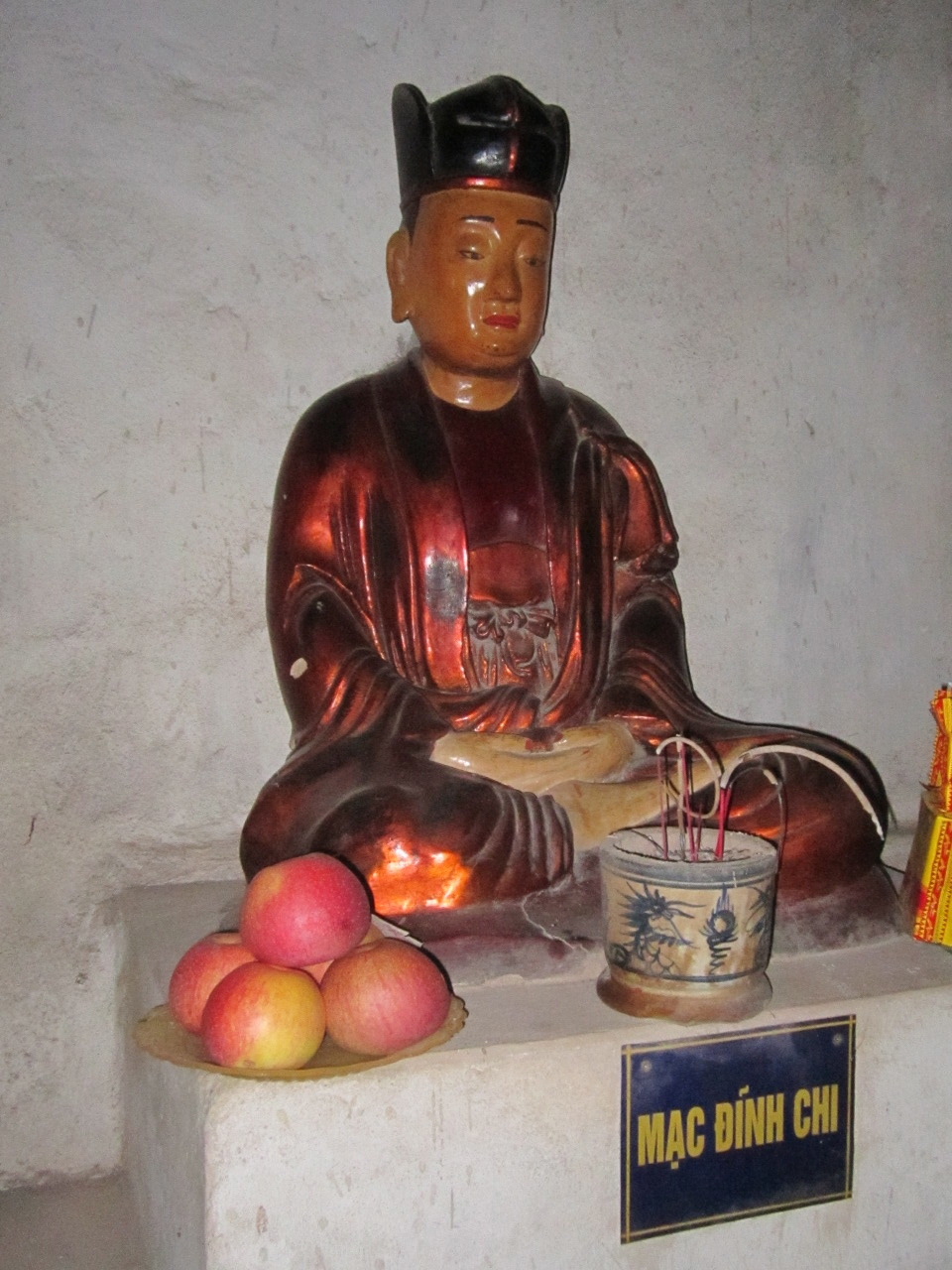
Statue of noble scholar Mạc Đĩnh Chi of Tran dynasty who was the ancestor of emperor Mạc Đăng Dung.

The most prestigious title of this examination was tam khôi (three first laureates), which was composed of three candidates who ranked first, second, and third in the examination with the names respectively of trạng nguyên (狀 元, exemplar of the state), bảng nhãn (榜 眼, eyes positioned alongside) and thám hoa (探 花, selective talent). The first tam khôi of the Trần dynasty were trạng nguyên Nguyễn Hiền, who was only 12 at that time, bảng nhãn Lê Văn Hưu who later became an imperial historian of the Trần dynasty, and thám hoa Đặng Ma La. In the 1256 examination, the Trần dynasty divided the title trạng nguyên into two categories, kinh trạng nguyên for candidates from northern provinces and trại trạng nguyên for those from two southern provinces: Thanh Hóa and Nghệ An, so that students from those remote regions could have the motivation for the imperial examination. This separation was abolished in 1275 when the ruler decided that it was no longer necessary.

In 1304, the Emperor Trần Anh Tông decided to standardize the examination by four different rounds in which candidates were eliminated step by step through tests of classical texts, Confucianist classics, imperial document redaction, and finally argument and planning. This examining process was abandoned in 1396 by the Emperor Trần Thuận Tông under pressure from Hồ Quý Ly, who replaced the traditional examination with the new version as a part of his radical reforms of the social and administrative system.

Hồ Quý Ly regulated the imperial examination by a prefectural examination (thi hương) and a metropolitan examination (thi hội) following in the next year. The second-degree examination included four rounds: literary dissertation, literary composition, imperial document redaction, and eventually an essay which was personally evaluated by the Emperor. For the lower-ranking officials, the emperor had another examination which tested writing and calculating, such as the examination in the sixth lunar month of 1261 during the reign of Trần Thánh Tông.

During its 175 years of existence, the Trần dynasty carried out fourteen imperial examinations including ten official and four auxiliary contests. Many laureates from these examinations later became prominent officials in the imperial court or well-known scholars such as Lê Văn Hưu, author of the historical accounts Đại Việt sử ký, Mạc Đĩnh Chi, renowned envoy of the Trần dynasty to the Yuan dynasty, or Nguyễn Trung Ngạn, one of the most powerful officials during the reign of Trần Minh Tông. Below is the complete list of examinations with the candidates who ranked first in each examination:

Year	Emperor	Ranked first	Note
1232	Trần Thái Tông	Trương Hanh; Lưu Diễm	
1234	Trần Thái Tông	Nguyễn Quan Quang	
1239	Trần Thái Tông	Lưu Miễn; Vương Giát	
1247	Trần Thái Tông	Nguyễn Hiền	Trạng nguyên
1256	Trần Thái Tông	Trần Quốc Lặc	Kinh trạng nguyên
1256	Trần Thái Tông	Trương Xán	Trại trạng nguyên
1266	Trần Thánh Tông	Trần Cố	Kinh trạng nguyên
1266	Trần Thánh Tông	Bạch Liêu	Trại trạng nguyên
1272	Trần Thánh Tông	Lý Đạo Tái	Trạng nguyên
1275	Trần Thánh Tông	Đào Tiêu	Trạng nguyên
1304	Trần Anh Tông	Mạc Đĩnh Chi	Trạng nguyên
1347	Trần Dụ Tông	Đào Sư Tích	Trạng nguyên

== Science and technology ==
There is evidence for the use of feng shui by Trần dynasty officials, such as in 1248 when Trần Thủ Độ ordered several feng shui masters to block many spots over the country for the purpose of protecting the newly founded Trần dynasty from its opponents. Achievements in science during the Trần dynasty were not detailed in historical accounts, though a notable scientist named Đặng Lộ was mentioned several times in Đại Việt sử kí toàn thư. It was said that Đặng Lộ was appointed by Retired Emperor Minh Tông to the position of national inspector (liêm phóng sứ) but he was noted for his invention called lung linh nghi, which was a type of armillary sphere for astronomic measurement. From the result in observation, Đặng Lộ successfully persuaded the emperor to modify the calendar in 1339 for a better fit with the agricultural seasons in Đại Việt. Marquis Trần Nguyên Đán, a superior of Đặng Lộ in the imperial court, was also an expert in calendar calculation.

=== Gunpowder ===
Near the end of the Trần dynasty the technology of gunpowder appeared in the historical records of Đại Việt. It was responsible for the death of the King of Champa, Chế Bồng Nga (Po Binasuor), after general Trần Khát Chân fired a cannon from his battleship in January 1390. According to the NUS researcher Sun Laichen, the Trần dynasty acquired gunpowder technology from China and effectively used it to change the balance of power between Đại Việt and Champa in favour of Đại Việt. As a result of this Sun reasoned that the need for copper for manufacturing firearms was probably another reason for the order of Hồ Quý Ly to change from copper coins to paper money in 1396.

The people of the Trần dynasty and the later Hồ dynasty continued to improve their firearms using gunpowder. This resulted in weapons of superior quality to their Chinese counterparts. These were acquired by the Ming dynasty in their invasion of Đại Việt.

=== Medicine ===
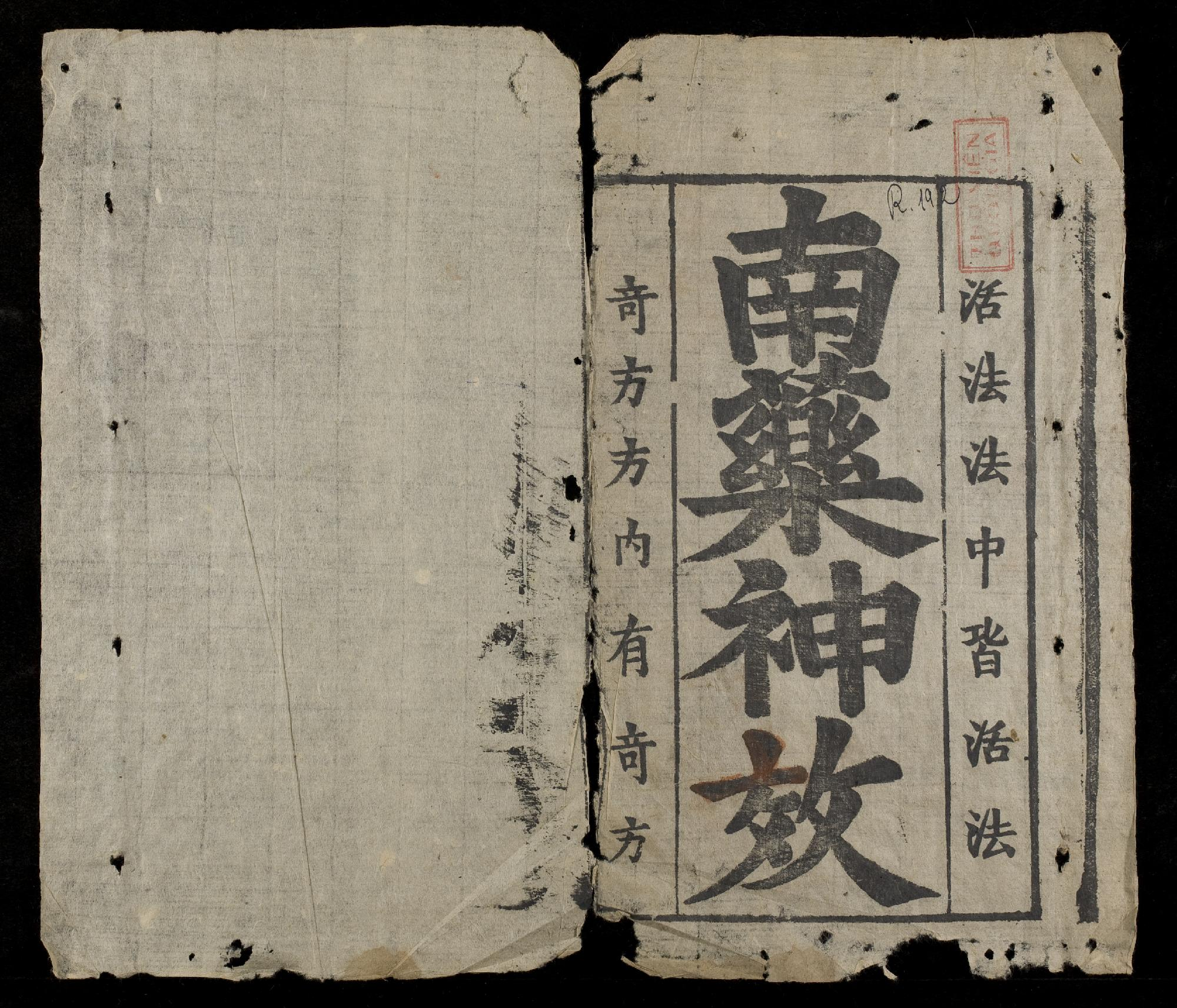
"Nam dược thần hiệu", the record book of Vietnamese traditional medicine in 14th century.

During the rule of the Trần dynasty, medicine had a better chance to develop because of a more significant role of Confucianism in society. In 1261, the emperor issued an order to establish the Institute of Imperial Physicians (Thái y viện) which managed medicine in Đại Việt, carrying out the examination for new physicians and treating people during disease epidemics. In 1265 the institute distributed a pill named Hồng ngọc sương to the poor, which they considered able to cure many diseases. Besides the traditional Northern herbs (thuốc Bắc), Trần physicians also began to cultivate and gather various regional medicinal herbs (thuốc Nam) for treating both civilians and soldiers. During the reign of Trần Minh Tông the head of the Institute of Imperial Physicians Phạm Công Bân was widely known for his medical ethics, treating patients regardless of their descent with his own medicine made from regional herbs; it was said that Phạm Công Bân gathered his remedies in a medical book named Thái y dịch bệnh (Diseases by the Imperial Physician).

The monk Phạm Công Bân, also known as Tuệ Tĩnh, who was a famous physician in Vietnamese history, was called the "Father of the Southern Medicine" for creating the basis of Vietnamese traditional medicine with his works Hồng nghĩa giác tư y thư and Nam dược thần hiệu. Nam dược thần hiệu was a collection of 499 manuscripts about local herbs and ten branches of treatment with 3932 prescriptions to cure 184 type of diseases while Hồng nghĩa giác tư y thư provided people with many simple, easy-to-prepare medicines that produced effective results.

== Gallery ==
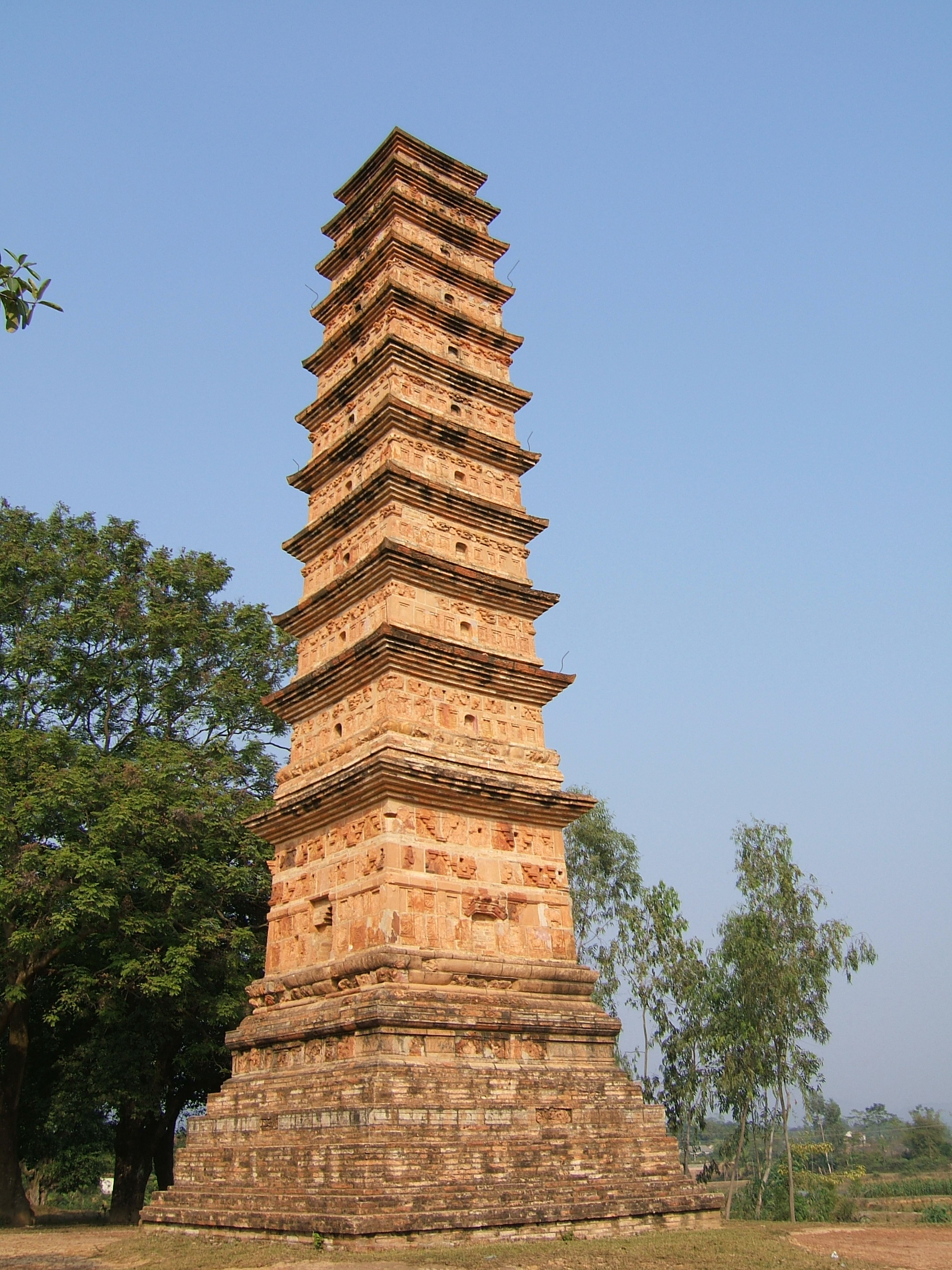
Bình Sơn pagoda of Vĩnh Khánh Temple, Trần dynasty, Tam Sơn commune, Phú Thọ province.

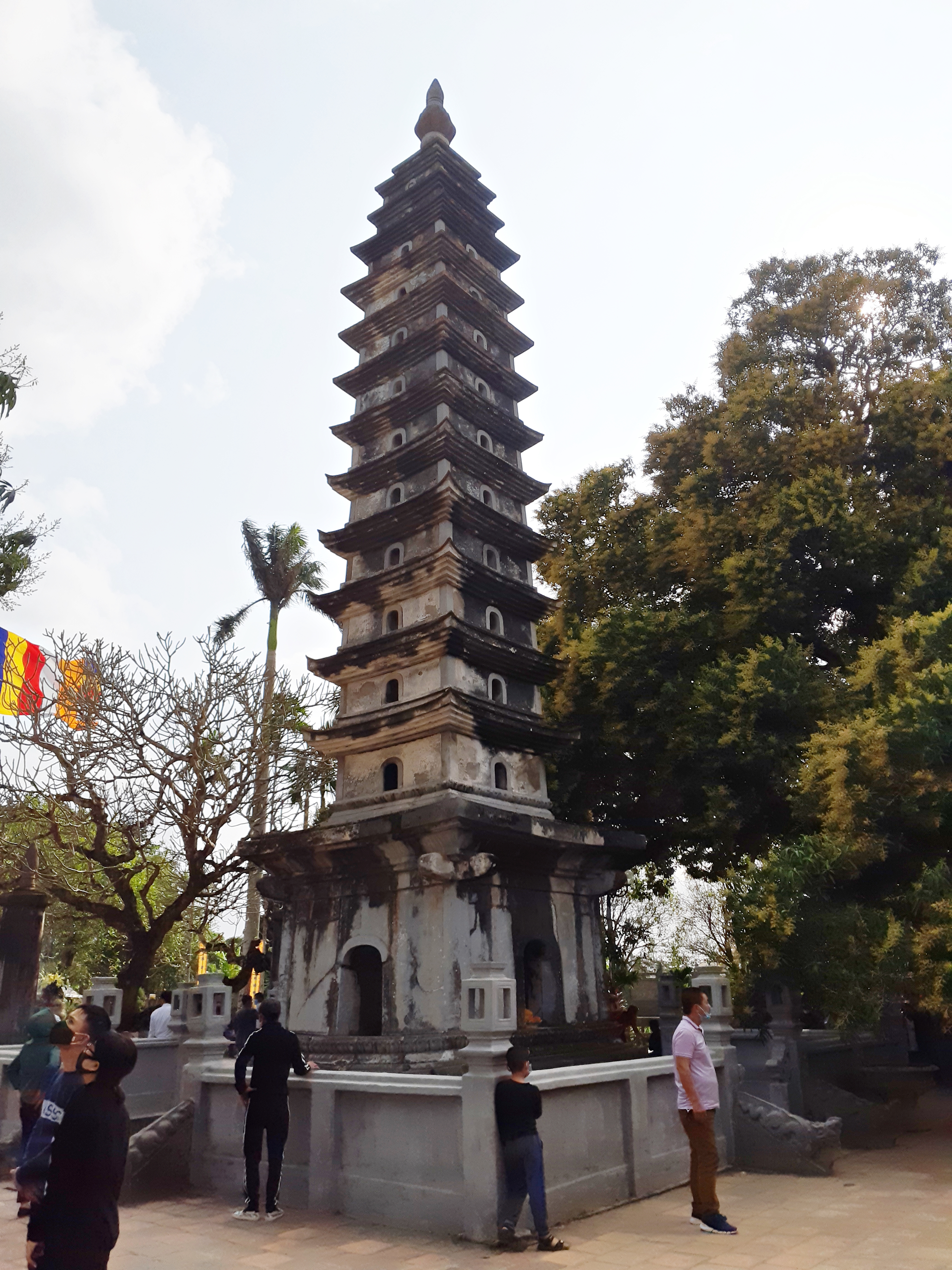
Pagoda of the Phổ Minh Temple

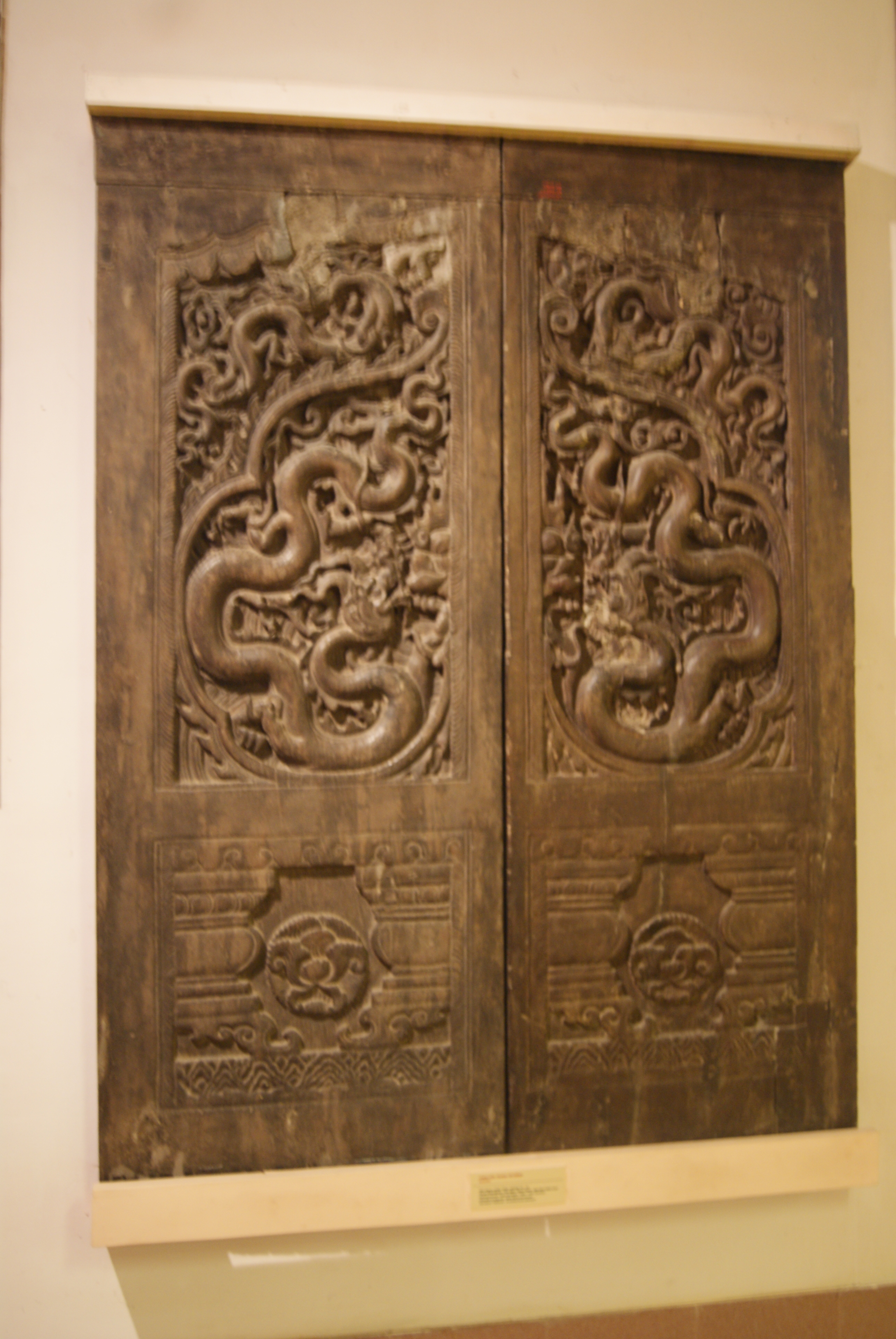
Wooden gate of Phổ Minh Temple

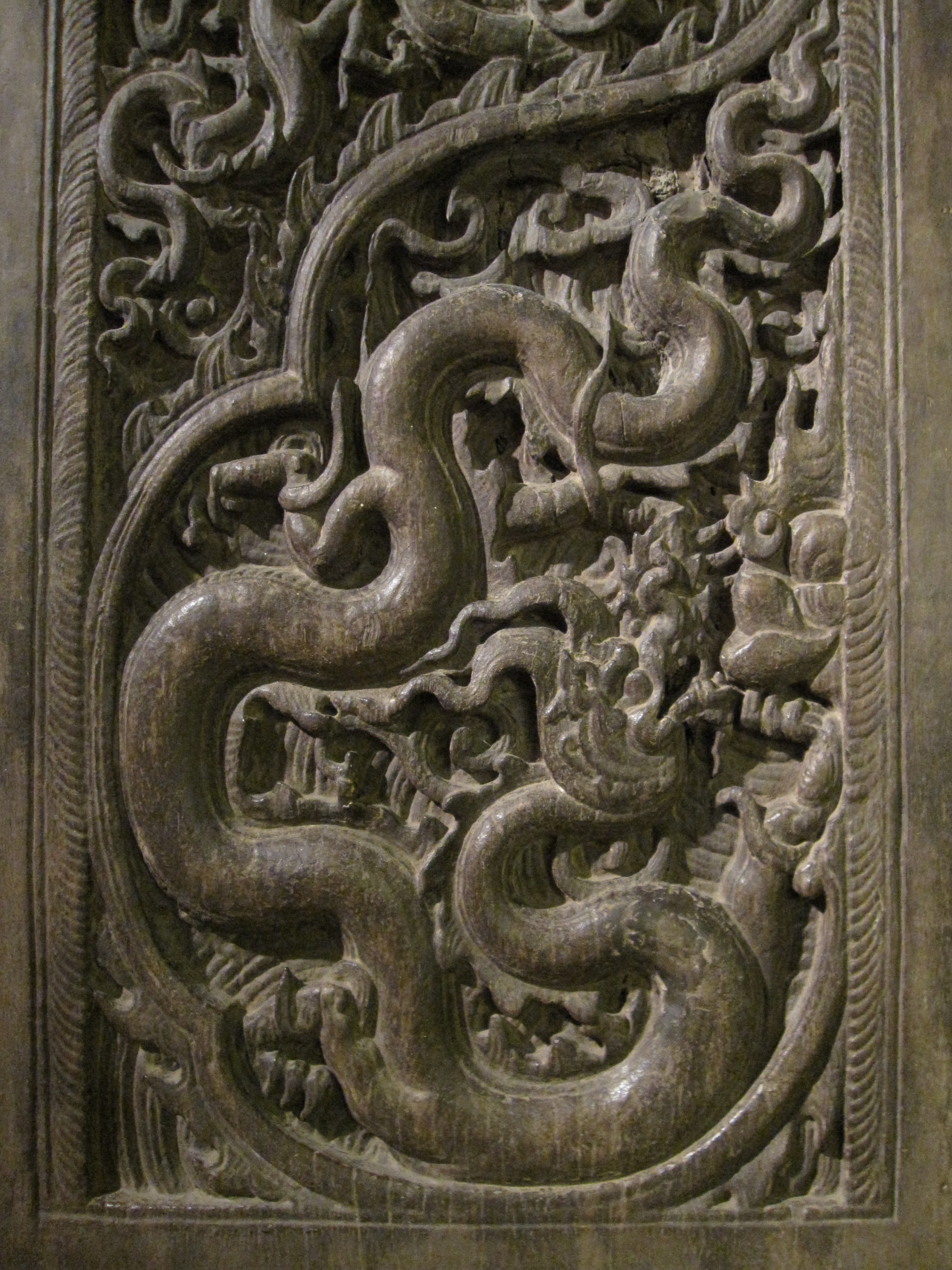
Carved wooden doors from the Phổ Minh Temple, Ninh Bình province, northern Vietnam (13th–14th century)

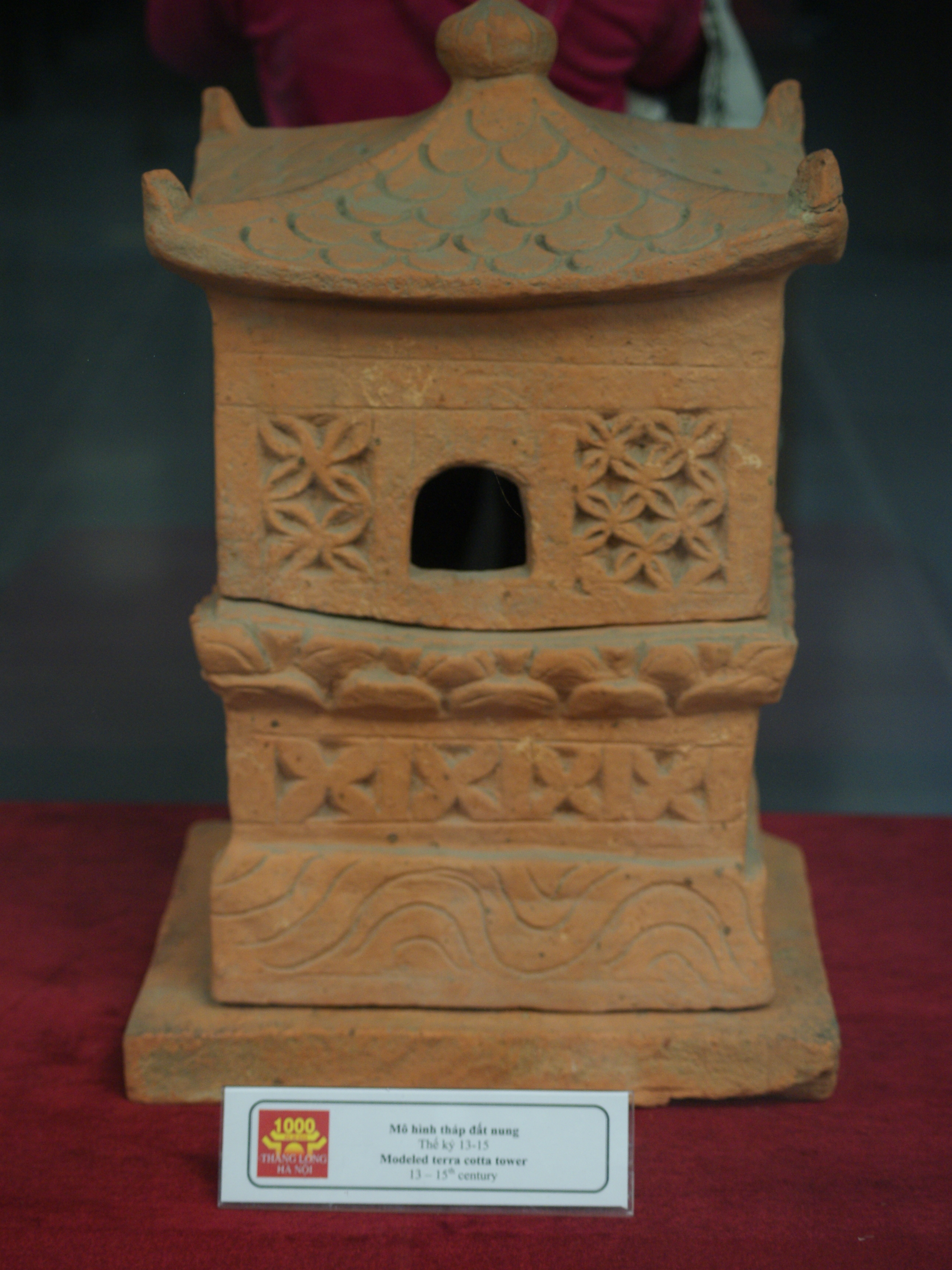
Terracotta Tower

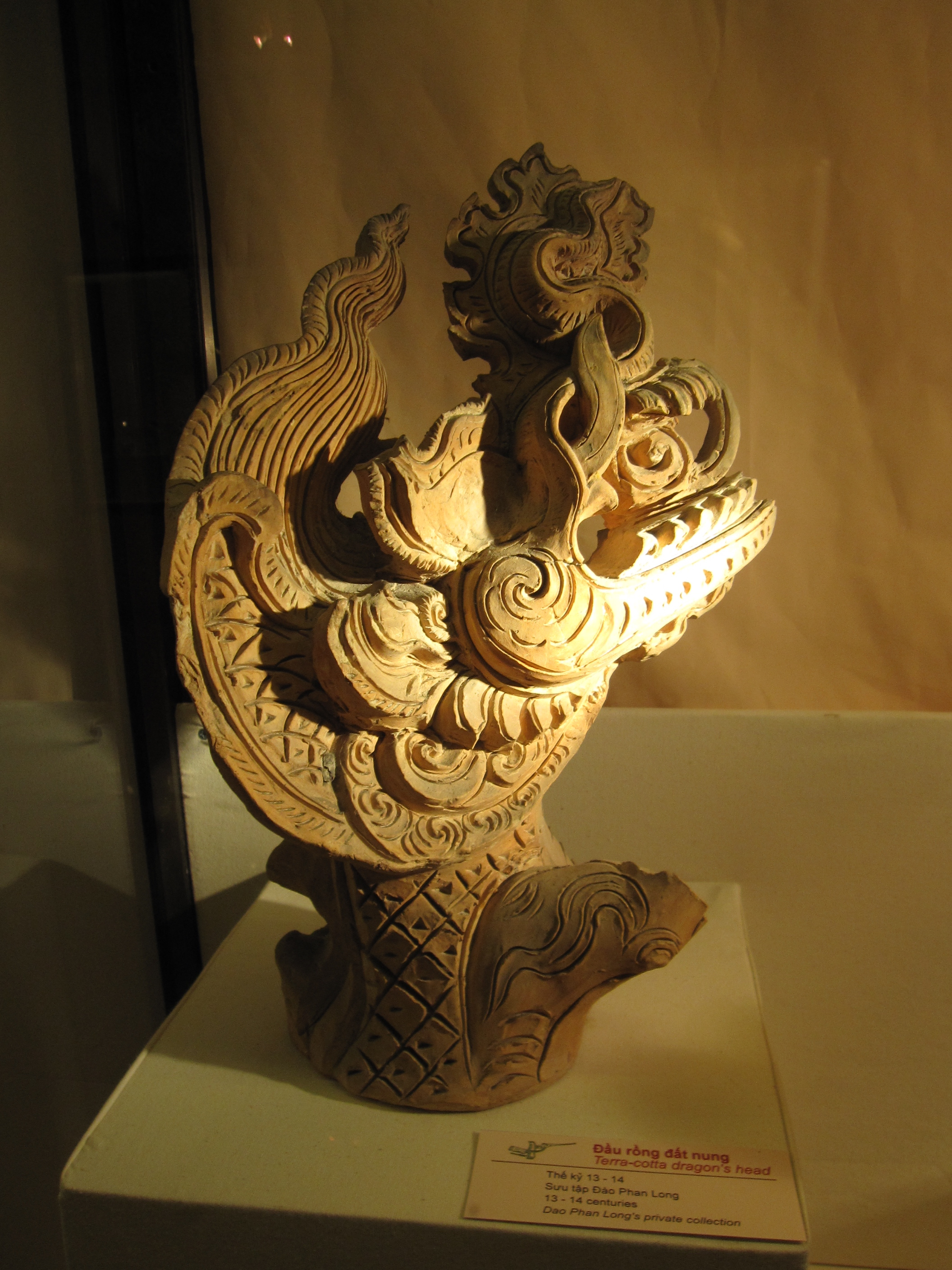
Dragon head. Terracotta, 14th–15th century. National Museum of Vietnamese History, Hanoi.

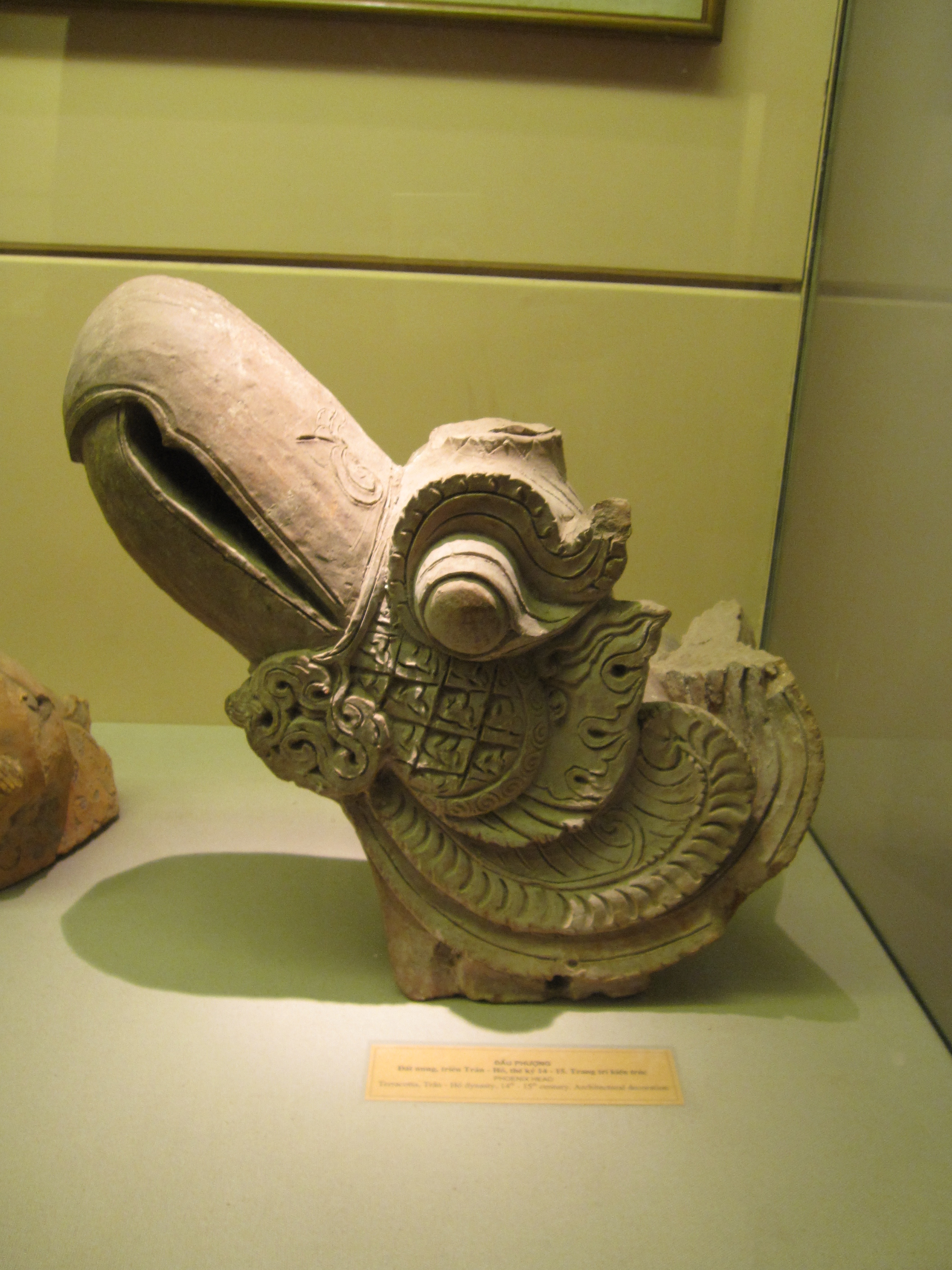
Phoenix head. Terracotta, Trần-Hồ dynasty, 14th–15th century. Architectural decoration. National Museum of Vietnamese History, Hanoi.

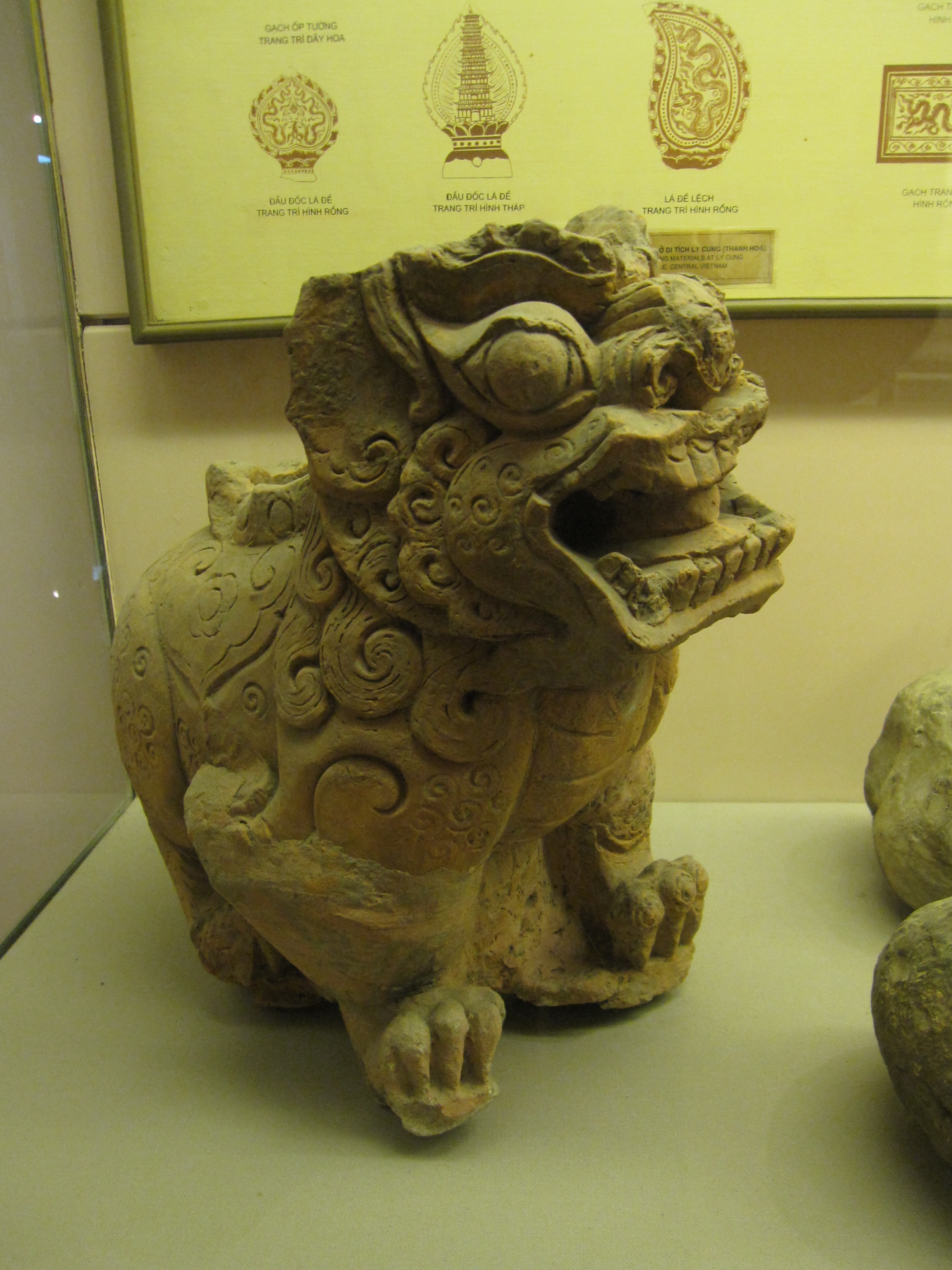
Lion figure. Terracotta, Trần-Hồ dynasty, 14th–15th century. Nghệ An province, central Vietnam. Architectural decoration. National Museum of Vietnamese History, Hanoi.

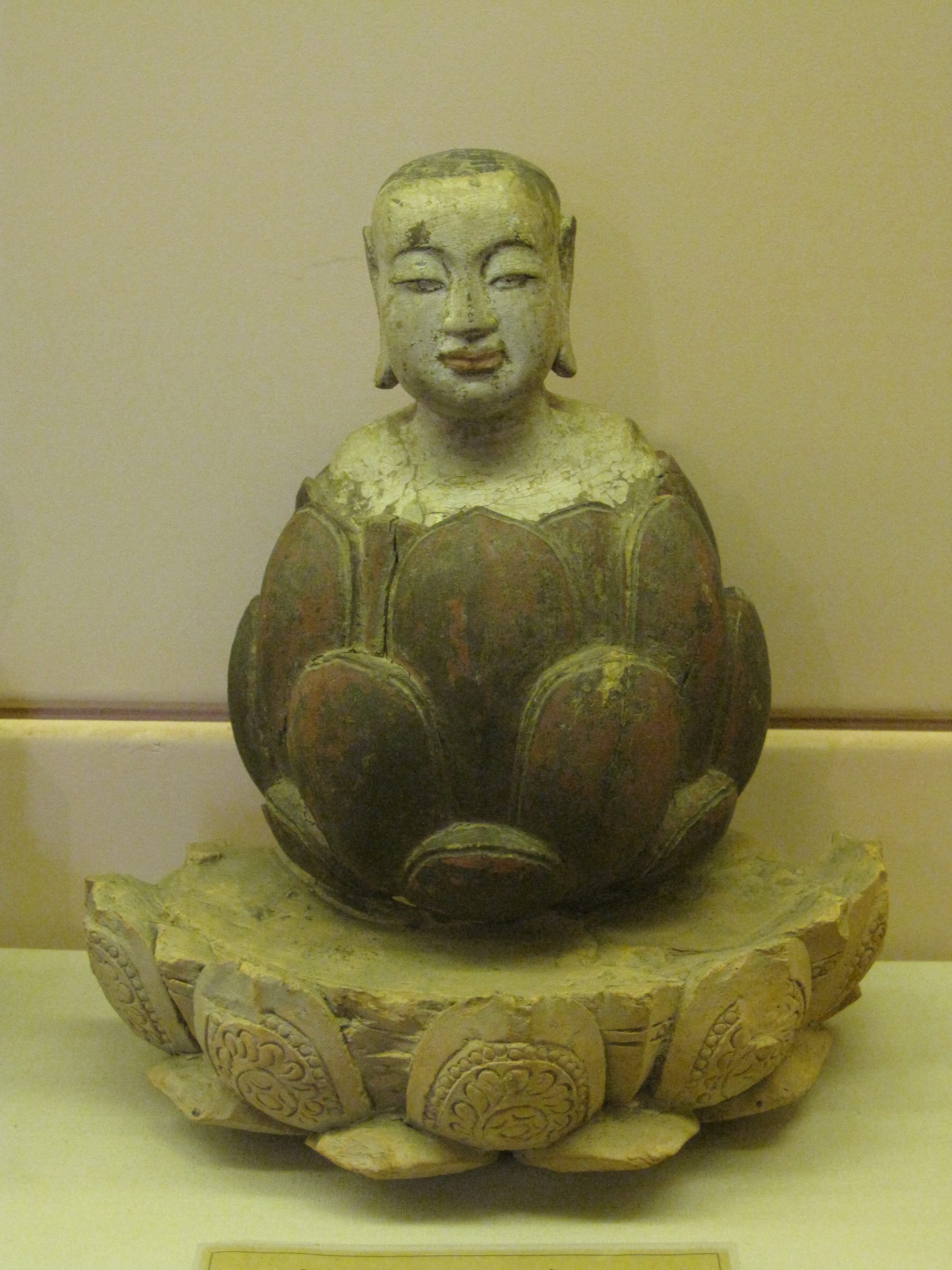
The boy Buddha rising up from lotus. Crimson and gilded wood, Trần-Hồ dynasty, 14th–15th century. Statue for worship. National Museum of Vietnamese History, Hanoi.

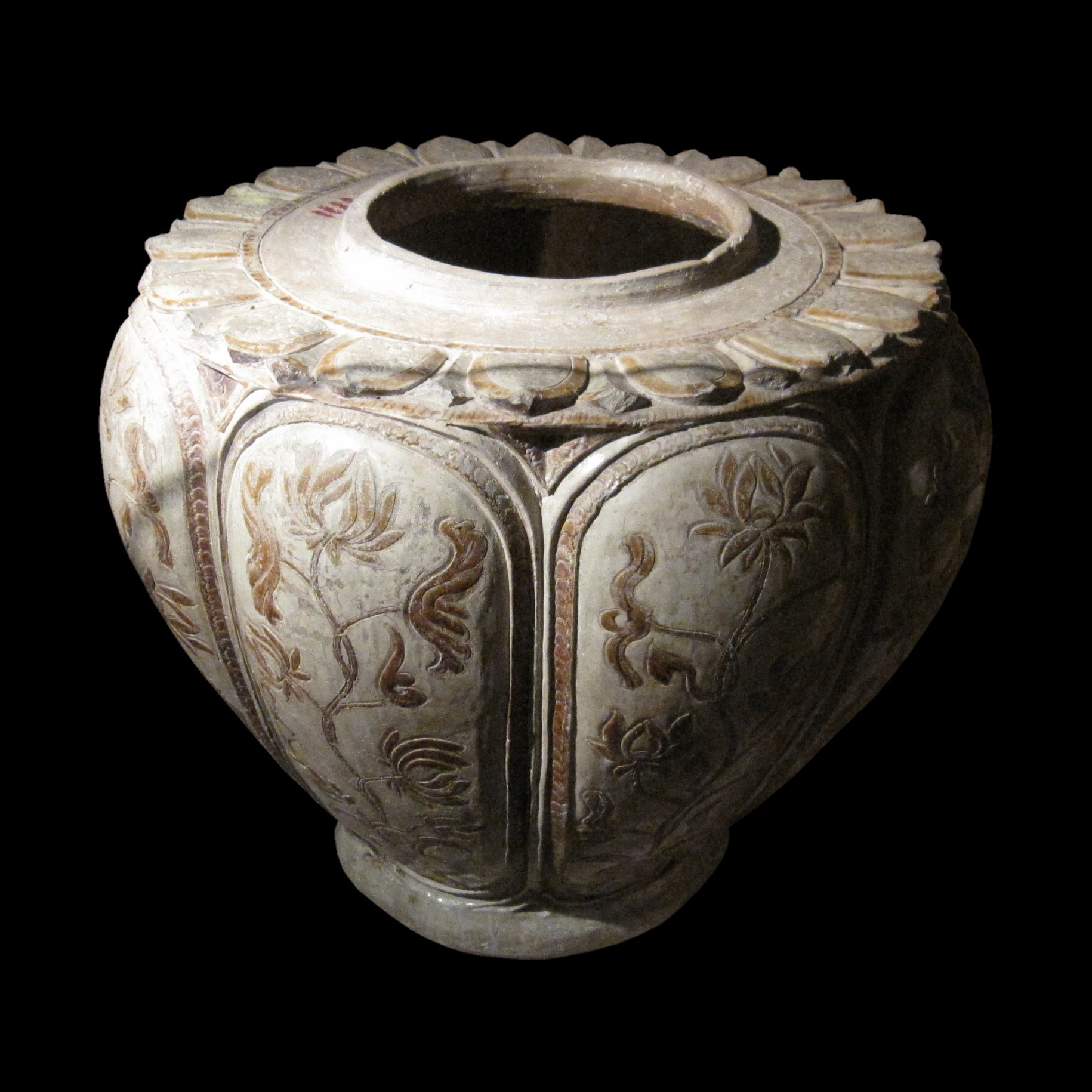
Patterned brown glazed ceramic jar with lotus and chrysanthemum motifs from Ninh Bình Province (13th–14th century)

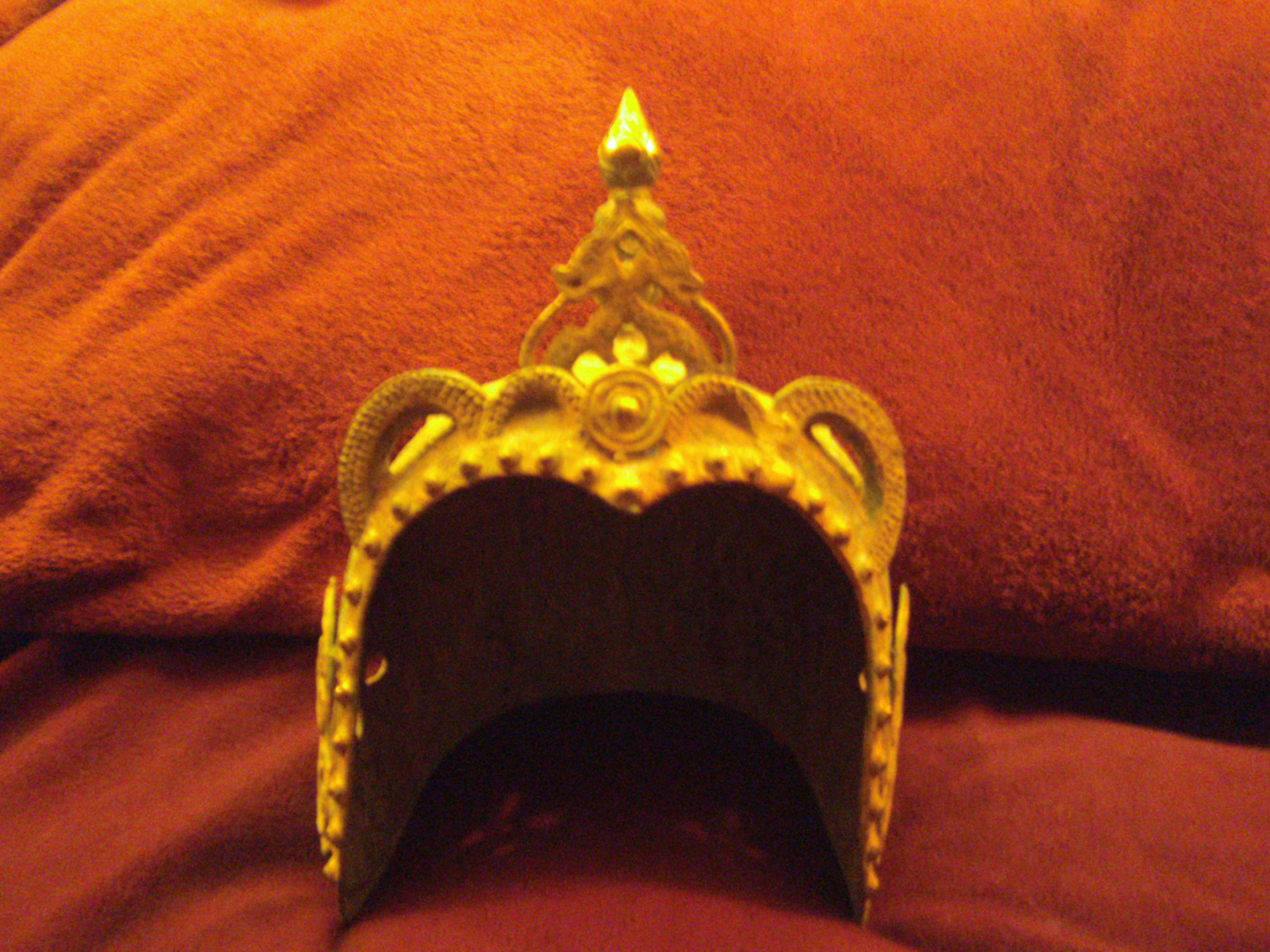
Bronze ceremonial helmet from the Tran dynasty in Dai-Viet

== Family tree ==
Thái Tổ
Thái Tông
Thánh Tông
Nhân Tông
Anh Tông
Minh Tông
Nghệ Tông	Hiến Tông	Dụ Tông	Duệ Tông	Cung Túc
Thuận Tông	Phế Đế	Nhật Lễ
Thiếu Đế

== See also ==
- List of emperors of the Trần dynasty

== Sources ==
- Alan Kam-leung Chan; Clancey, Gregory K.; Hui-Chieh Loy (2001), Historical perspectives on East Asian science, technology, and medicine, World Scientific, ISBN 9971-69-259-7
- Chapuis, Oscar (1995), A history of Vietnam: from Hong Bang to Tu Duc, Greenwood Publishing Group, ISBN 0-313-29622-7
- Dương Quảng Hàm (1968), Việt-Nam văn-học (in Vietnamese), Trung-Tâm-Học-Liệu
- Dutton, George; Werner, Jayne; Whitmore, John K. (2012), Sources of Vietnamese Tradition, Columbia University Press, ISBN 978-0-231-51110-0
- Hall, Kenneth R., ed. (2008), Secondary Cities and Urban Networking in the Indian Ocean Realm, C. 1400–1800, Comparative Urban Studies, vol. 1, Lexington Books, ISBN 978-0-7391-2835-0
- Mai Hồng (1989), Các trạng nguyên nước ta (in Vietnamese), Hanoi: Education Publishing House
- Miller, Terry E.; Williams, Sean (2008), The Garland handbook of Southeast Asian music, Routledge, ISBN 978-0-415-96075-5
- National Bureau for Historical Record (1998), Khâm định Việt sử Thông giám cương mục (in Vietnamese), Hanoi: Education Publishing House
- Ngô Sĩ Liên (1993), Đại Việt sử ký toàn thư (in Vietnamese) (Nội các quan bản ed.), Hanoi: Social Science Publishing House
- Phạm Văn Sơn (1983), Việt sử toàn thư (in Vietnamese), Japan: Association of Vietnameses in Japan
- Taylor, K. W. (2013), A History of the Vietnamese, Cambridge University Press, ISBN 978-0-521-87586-8
- Tham Seong Chee (1981), Essays on Literature and Society in Southeast Asia: Political and Sociological Perspectives, Singapore: NUS Press, ISBN 9971-69-036-5
- Tuyet Nhung Tran; Reid, Anthony J. S. (2006), Việt Nam Borderless Histories, Madison, Wisconsin: University of Wisconsin Press, ISBN 978-0-299-21770-9
- Trần Trọng Kim (1971), Việt Nam sử lược (in Vietnamese), Saigon: Center for School Materials
- Trương Hữu Quýnh; Đinh Xuân Lâm; Lê Mậu Hãn (2008), Đại cương lịch sử Việt Nam (in Vietnamese), Hanoi: Education Publishing House
- Whitmore, John K. (2022). "The Sông Cái (Red River) Delta, the Chinese Diaspora, and the Trần/Chen Clan of Ðại Việt". Crossroads: An Interdisciplinary Journal of Asian Interactions. 19 (2): 210–232. doi:10.1163/26662523-12340011. S2CID 247914991.

Preceded by Lý dynasty	Dynasty of Vietnam; 1225–1400	Succeeded by Hồ dynasty
