= Trần Minh Tông =

Trần Minh Tông 陳明宗
- Emperor of Đại Việt
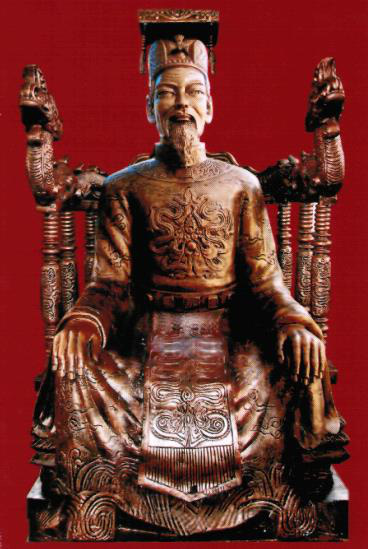
- Statue of Emperor Trần Minh Tông

Emperor of Trần dynasty
- Reign: 3 April 1314 – 15 March 1329
- Predecessor: Trần Anh Tông
- Successor: Trần Hiến Tông

Retired Emperor of Trần dynasty
- Reign: 15 March 1329 – 10 March 1357
- Predecessor: Trần Anh Tông
- Successor: Trần Nghệ Tông
- Born: 4 September 1300; Thăng Long, Đại Việt
- Died: 10 March 1357 (aged 56); Đại Việt
- Burial: Mục Tomb
- Spouse: Queen Lê Thánh
- Issue: Crown Prince Trần Vượng Prince Cung Tĩnh Trần Nguyên Trác; Prince Cung Định Trần Phủ; Prince Cung Mẫn Trần Nguyên Hú; Prince Cung Giản Trần Nguyên Thạch; Prince Cung Túc Trần Nguyên Dục; Prince Cung Tín Trần Thiên Trạch; Trần Hạo Prince Cung Tuyên Trần Kính and two daughters
Names
- Trần Mạnh (陳奣)
Era dates
- Đại Khánh (大慶, 1314–1323); Khai Thái (開泰, 1324–1329)
Regnal name
- Thể Thiên Sùng Hóa Khâm Minh Duệ Hiếu hoàng đế (體天崇化欽明睿孝皇帝)
Posthumous name
- Chương-nghiêu văn-triết hoàng-đế (章堯文哲皇帝)
Temple name
- Minh Tông (明宗)
- House: Trần dynasty
- Father: Trần Anh Tông
- Mother: Imperial Consort Huy Tư
- Religion: Buddhism

Trần Minh Tông (4 September 1300 – 10 March 1357), real name Trần Mạnh (陳奣), was the fifth emperor of the Trần dynasty who ruled Đại Việt from 1314 to 1329. After ceding the throne to his son Trần Hiến Tông, Minh Tông held the title of Retired Emperor (Vietnamese: Thái thượng hoàng) for 29 years. As the last emperor in the prosperous period of Trần dynasty, Minh Tông was known for his successful reign of Đại Việt with the assistance of many talented mandarins. Minh Tông was also the longest-reigning retired emperor in history of Vietnam when he acted as a regent and co-ruled with Hiến Tông and Dụ Tông. His death marked a significant turning point in the history of the Trần Dynasty, as the country began to decline and soon fell into troubled times.

== Childhood ==
Minh Tông was born in 1300 as Trần Mạnh, the only surviving son of emperor Trần Anh Tông and imperial consort Huy Tư, who was the daughter of general Trần Bình Trọng. According to Đại Việt sử ký toàn thư, the precise birthday of Prince Trần Mạnh was 21 August in the lunar calendar, only one day after the death of Trần Hưng Đạo who was the most important minister in the early Trần dynasty and the main commander of second and third wars of resistance by Đại Việt against Mongol Empire, which made him one of the most famous heroes of Vietnam. The other sons of Anh Tông all died at a young age so the Emperor had his relative and important figure of the Trần clan, Trần Nhật Duật, raise Trần Mạnh in the hope that he would survive and began a key figure in the family. Indeed, Prince Trần Mạnh was well looked after due to the wholehearted devotion of Trần Nhật Duật.

In 1312, during the campaign against Champa personally commanded by Anh Tông, the 12-year-old prince Trần Mạnh was temporarily entrusted to the throne with assistance from Trần Nhật Duật and Trần Quốc Tú. Two years after, Anh Tông officially ceded his throne to Trần Mạnh, who ruled as Emperor Trần Minh Tông, but continued to hold the title Retired Emperor (Thái thượng hoàng).

== As emperor ==
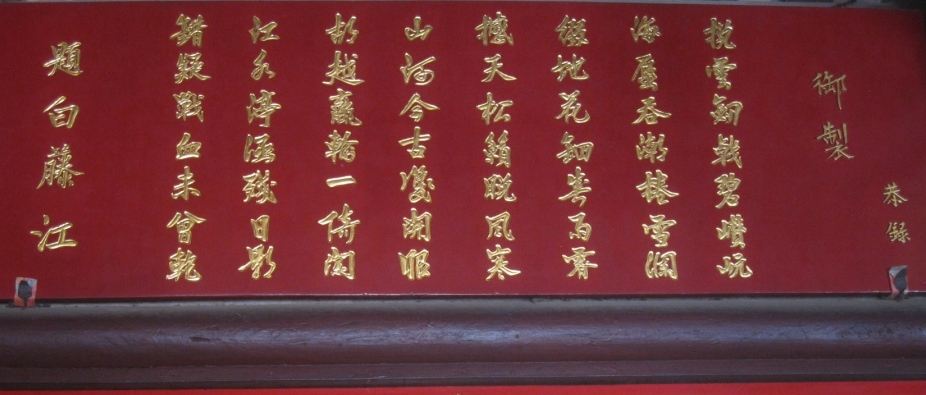
Inscription bearing poem of Trần Minh Tông.

According to history scholars, Minh Tông was a ruler of good intent but had no long-term vision of nation building. Despite that shortcoming, the Emperor still successfully governed Đại Việt with the assistance of many capable mandarins like Phạm Ngũ Lão, Đoàn Nhữ Hài, Mạc Đĩnh Chi and Chu Văn An. His biggest mistake, as often cited in historical records, was the death of Trần Quốc Chẩn, the Emperor's father-in-law and a prominent general.

In contrast to his father, Minh Tông had many sons. The first, prince Trần Vượng, was born not by Queen Lê Thánh but the Emperor's second consort Anh Tư. That led to a struggle between two parties in royal court, one that supported prince Trần Vượng for the position of Minh Tông's successor, while the other suggested that the position of crown prince must be reserved for the Queen's son. As a consequence, leader of the former, Trần Khắc Chung, who was the mandarin responsible for the escape of Princess Huyền Trân from Champa, launched a defamation campaign against Trần Quốc Chẩn who was not only the Queen's father but also a prominent general with many victories in battle. Believing the information provided by Trần Khắc Chung, Minh Tông ordered the imprisonment of his father-in-law, Trần Quốc Chẩn, who was deprived of food and ultimately died in 1328.

Continuing the foreign policy created by Anh Tông, Minh Tông kept friendly relations with Yuan dynasty while reinforcing the southern border to deal with the increasing hostility from the kingdom of Champa. In 1318, the Đại Việt army led by Trần Quốc Chẩn and Phạm Ngũ Lão won a campaign in Champa in which many Champa soldiers were killed. King Che Nang had to flee to Java, but a Trần marquis named Lý Tất Kiến also died in action. However, in 1326, Che Anan relieved Champa of its vassalage to Annam.

In 1329, Minh Tông decided to pass the throne to prince Trần Vượng, now emperor Hiến Tông, and took the position of Retired Emperor (Thái thượng hoàng). During his reign, Minh Tông had two era names, which were Đại Khánh (大 慶, great jubilee, 1314–1323) and Khai Thái (開 泰, prosperous bloom, 1324–1329).

== As retired emperor ==
The new emperor Hiến Tông was only a ten-year-old boy, so Minh Tông still kept real power behind the scenes in the royal court. In the period of Hiến Tông's reign, Đại Việt's army was defeated several times in skirmishes with Laos and Champa because of the lack of capable generals after the deaths of many capable officials like Phạm Ngũ Lão in 1320, Trần Quốc Chẩn in 1328 and Trần Nhật Duật in 1330. In the operation against Laos in 1335, Minh Tông personally commanded the military but the Đại Việt army continued to lose, while an important mandarin, Đoàn Nhữ Hài, was drowned in battle. Otherwise, there were increasing numbers of incompetent or corrupt officials in the royal court of Minh Tông and Hiến Tông and they became a significant factor in the growing instability of the later phase of the Trần dynasty.

Hiến Tông died in 1341 leaving no heir. Minh Tông therefore passed the throne to his tenth son, Trần Hạo, now Dụ Tông. For the next sixteen years, the Retired Emperor continued to wield real power over Trần Dynasty while the Emperor reigned only nominally. Minh Tông died in 1357, and he was posthumously named as Chương nghiêu văn triết hoàng đế (章堯文哲皇帝). The death of Minh Tông also marked the end of a prosperous and stable era of Đại Việt under the Trần Dynasty, and the country began to decline as the royal court and Trần clan soon fell into chaos.

== Family ==
- Minh Tông had including one empress, one other wife and one concubine:
  - Empress Lê Thánh, eldest daughter of prince Hue Vu Trần Quốc Chẩn
  - Imperial consort Anh Tư
  - Imperial concubine Lê Thị
- Minh Tông had eleven sons and two daughters, two sons died young:
  - Trần Vượng (1319–1341), who eventually became emperor Trần Hiến Tông
  - Prince Cung Tĩnh Trần Nguyên Trác (1319–1370)
  - Prince Cung Định Trần Phủ (1321–1394), who eventually became emperor Trần Nghệ Tông
  - Prince Cung Mẫn Trần Nguyên Hú (?–1347)
  - Prince Cung Giản Trần Nguyên Thạch (?–1350)
  - Prince Cung Túc Trần Nguyên Dục (?–1364)
  - Prince Cung Tín Trần Thiên Trạch (?–1379)
  - Trần Hạo (1336–1369), who eventually became emperor Trần Dụ Tông
  - Prince Cung Tuyên Trần Kính (1337–1377), who eventually became emperor Trần Duệ Tông
  - Thiên Ninh Princess Trần Ngọc Tha (Bạch Tha)
  - Huy Ninh Princess (?–1370), wife of Hồ Quý Ly

Trần Minh Tông House of Trần Born: 1300 Died: 1357
Regnal titles
| Preceded by Trần Anh Tông | Emperor of Trần dynasty 1314–1329 | Succeeded by Trần Hiến Tông |
| Preceded by Trần Anh Tông | Retired Emperor of Trần dynasty 1329–1357 | Succeeded by Trần Nghệ Tông |
