= Trần Hiến Tông =

Trần Hiến Tông 陳憲宗
- Emperor of Đại Việt
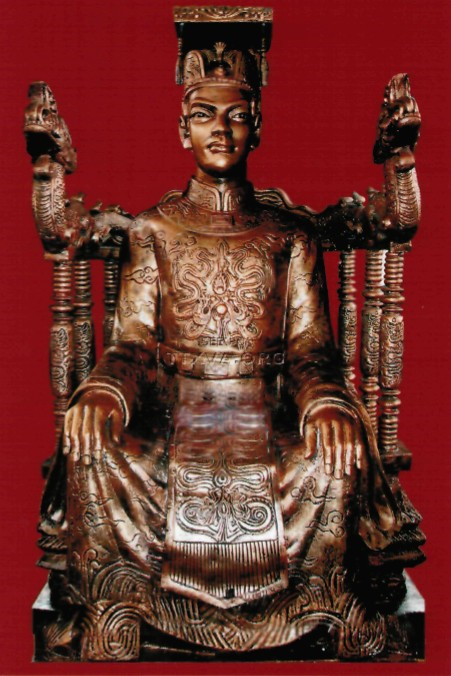

Emperor of Trần dynasty
- Reign: 1329–1341
- Predecessor: Trần Minh Tông
- Successor: Trần Dụ Tông
- Born: 17 May 1319; Thăng Long, Đại Việt
- Died: 11 June 1341 (aged 22); Đại Việt
- Burial: Xương-an Tomb
- Spouse: Imperial Consort Hiển Trinh
- Issue: no heir
Names
- Trần Vượng (陳旺)
Era dates
- Khai Hựu (開祐, 1329–1341)
Posthumous name
- none
Temple name
- Hiến Tông (憲宗)
- House: Trần dynasty
- Father: Trần Minh Tông
- Mother: Imperial Consort Anh Tư
- Religion: Buddhism

Trần Hiến Tông (17 May 1319 – 11 June 1341), given name Trần Vượng (陳 旺), was the sixth emperor of the Trần dynasty who reigned Đại Việt from 1329 to 1341. Enthroned by Minh Tông when he was only a ten-year-old boy, Hiến Tông ruled Đại Việt with the regent of the Retired Emperor Minh Tông during his thirteen years of reign. The Emperor died at the age of 23 and leaving no heir, he was succeeded by his younger brother Trần Hạo. The death of Hiến Tông and his father afterward marked the turning-point in history of Trần dynasty when the country began to fall into the trouble times.

== Background and during Minh Tông's reign ==
Hiến Tông was born in 1319 as Trần Vượng, the first son of Emperor Trần Minh Tông and his imperial consort Anh Tư. At that time, the birth of prince Trần Vượng ignited a fierce struggle in royal court between two parties, one supported prince Trần Vượng for the position of Minh Tông's successor, the other suggested that the crown prince must be reserved for the Queen's son. This struggle eventually led to the death of the Queen's father Trần Quốc Chẩn who was also a prominent general with many victories in battle.

In 1329, Minh Tông decided to pass the throne to prince Trần Vượng, now emperor Hiến Tông, and took the position of Retired Emperor (Vietnamese: Thái thượng hoàng). Trần Vượng was only ten at his coronation.

== As emperor ==
According to Đại Việt sử ký toàn thư, Hiến Tông was known for his intelligence and righteousness. During the period that the Emperor and Retired Emperor co-ruled, Đại Việt people was able to witness the last period of real prosperity and peace in history of Trần dynasty. Although still having a successful reign with the assistance of capable royal court, Hiến Tông had to face with the first signs of decline such as the deceases of many important and experienced mandarins like Trần Nhật Duật (1330), Trần Khắc Chung (1330), Đoàn Nhữ Hài (died in campaign against Laos, 1335) and Trần Khánh Dư (1339).

Continuing the precedent set by Anh Tông, Minh Tông and Hiến Tông maintained friendly relations with the Yuan dynasty while also reinforcing the southern and western border to deal with the increasing hostility from Laos and Champa. However, in contrast with the military ventures of the early Trần dynasty, campaigns during the reign of Hiến Tông often experienced failure. In 1335, a campaign led by Minh Tông in person against Laotian forces was defeated and the Trần royal court lost Đoàn Nhữ Hài, who was drowned in action.

Hiến Tông died on 6 June of lunar calendar, 1341 at age 23, leaving no heir. Minh Tông therefore passed the throne to his tenth son, Trần Hạo, now Dụ Tông. During his reign, Hiến Tông had one era name which was Khai Hựu (開 佑, prosperity), other than his predecessors, the Emperor had no posthumous name. Despite his natural talent, the achievements of Hiến Tông during the reign are difficult to attribute to him because his father still held real power in the position of retired emperor.

== Family ==
- Hiến Tông had one wife, lineage is Đế Hiển Trinh who was daughter of the Prince Huệ Túc Trần Đại Niên.

Trần Hiến Tông House of Trần Born: 1319 Died: 1341
Regnal titles
Preceded by Trần Minh Tông	Emperor of Trần dynasty 1329–1341	Succeeded by Trần Dụ Tông
