= Trần Nhật Duật =

Vietnamese politician during Trần dynasty

Trần Nhật Duật 陳 日 燏
- Prince Chiêu Văn
- Born: 1255; Thăng Long, Đại Việt
- Died: 1330 (aged 74–75); Thăng Long, Đại Việt
- House: Trần dynasty
- Father: Trần Thái Tông

Prince Chiêu Văn Trần Nhật Duật (1255–1330) was the sixth son of Trần Thái Tông, first emperor of the Trần dynasty. Being a younger brother of the emperor Trần Thánh Tông, Trần Nhật Duật was one of the most important figures of the Trần family and royal court during the reigns of four successive emperors: Thánh Tông, Nhân Tông, Anh Tông and Minh Tông. In the second war of resistance against Mongol invasion, Trần Nhật Duật was the general who commanded the Đại Việt army to defeat the navy of Mongol general Sogetu in the Battle of Hàm Tử, one of the biggest victories of the Trần dynasty. With his knowledge of numerous foreign languages and cultures, Prince Chiêu Văn was also a prominent diplomat of the Trần dynasty who helped the emperor to maintain good relations with several ethnic groups in the northwestern region of Đại Việt.

== Background ==
Trần Nhật Duật was born in 1255 as the sixth son of the emperor Trần Thái Tông. According to Đại Việt sử kí toàn thư, Trần Nhật Duật was born with four characters "Chiêu Văn đồng tử" ("pupil of Chiêu Văn") in his arm, which is why he was entitled Prince Chiêu Văn (Vietnamese: Chiêu Văn vương) in 1268. Besides the emperor Trần Thánh Tông, Trần Nhật Duật had two other famous elder brothers, Prince Chiêu Minh (Chiêu Minh vương) Trần Quang Khải, who was grand chancellor of the royal court, and Prince Chiêu Quốc (Chiêu Quốc vương) Trần Ích Tắc, who was broadly known not only for his intelligence but also for his notorious defection to Yuan side during the second Mongol invasion of Đại Việt.

Since he was young, Trần Nhật Duật began to make friends with many foreigners from Champa or the Song dynasty with whom he could discuss by their own languages and customs. One of them was Triệu Trung, a refugee from China, who eventually became Trần Nhật Duật's subordinate during the war against the Yuan dynasty. Prince Chiêu Văn spoke foreign languages, even some exotic ones, so well that he was once mistaken as a Chinese by an Yuan ambassador.

== History ==
=== Diplomatic activities ===
Two years after the coronation of Trần Nhân Tông (in 1280), head of Đà Giang Circuit Trịnh Giác Mật rose a revolt against Trần rulers. Being an expert of minority people's language and culture, Trần Nhật Duật was appointed by Nhân Tông to take charge of pacifying this revolt by diplomatic means. At the age of 25, Trần Nhật Duật went directly into the headquarters of Trịnh Giác Mật with only several servants and discussed with the head of revolt by his own language and manner. Trịnh Giác Mật and his men were so impressed by Trần Nhật Duật that they decided to unconditionally surrender the Trần dynasty and the revolt was since put down without any casualty. After the pacification, Trịnh Giác Mật and his family were still well treated by Trần Nhật Duật; therefore, Prince Chiêu Văn gradually became a respected figure among ethnic groups in the northwestern region.

=== Military activities ===
In 1279, the Yuan dynasty had the decisive victory over the Song dynasty in the Battle of Yamen which marked the end of the Song dynasty and the total control of Kublai Khan over China. As a result, Kublai Khan began to expose his attempt to take over the southern countries like Đại Việt or Champa. In December 1284, the second Yuan's invasion of Đại Việt was opened under the command of Kublai Khan's prince Toghan. Đại Việt was attacked in two directions: Toghan himself conducted the infantry invaded from the northern border while Yuan's navy under general Sogetu advanced from the southern border through Champa's territory. At the beginning of the war, Prince Chiêu Văn took charge of a military base near the northern border, and thanks to his accurate judgment, Trần Nhật Duật's troops was able to escape the trap of Yuan army and successfully retreated. Ultimately, Sogetu's army suffered heavy defeat in the Battle of Hàm Tử, where Trần Nhật Duật commanded allied troops of Đại Việt soldiers and former Song refugees.

During the reign of Trần Anh Tông, Prince Chiêu Văn and general Phạm Ngũ Lão were responsible for the quelling some rebellions in northern region.

=== In the imperial court ===
Holding several high positions during the reigns of four successive emperors, Thánh Tông, Nhân Tông, Anh Tông and Minh Tông, Prince Chiêu Văn became an important figure of both the royal family and royal court; he was appointed as grand chancellor in 1302 during the reign of Anh Tông. Since the other sons of Anh Tông all died at a young age, the emperor had Trần Nhật Duật take the duty of bringing up crown prince Trần Mạnh, his only surviving son. Indeed, Prince Trần Mạnh was well looked after due to the wholehearted devotion of Trần Nhật Duật and finally became the emperor Trần Minh Tông. It was also Trần Nhật Duật and Trần Quốc Tú who assisted the 12-year-old Crown Prince Trần Mạnh in ruling the country when Anh Tông was away for a military campaign against Champa in 1312.

Trần Nhật Duật died in 1330 at the age of 75.

== Family ==
Trần Nhật Duật had one wife, Lady Trinh Túc, who was of Thanh Hóa origin, so his other concubines all came from Thanh Hóa and descendants of Prince Chiêu Văn were often appointed as officials in this region. The only son of Trần Nhật Duật is Marquis Cương Đông Văn Hiến (Cương Đông Văn Hiến hầu), who plotted with Trần Khắc Chung the defamation campaign which led to the death of Trần Quốc Chẩn, father-in-law of the emperor and prominent general, to keep the position of throne successor for prince Trần Vượng.

== Legacy ==
In his work Đại Việt sử kí toàn thư, the court historian Ngô Sĩ Liên praised Trần Nhật Duật as not only a capable official but also a gentleman of intelligence and culture. He was a polyglot and was known to be able to converse in Chinese, Cham and Malay. Despite holding high position in royal court for many years, Prince Chiêu Văn always kept an amiable, tolerant attitude and was well known as a scholar with wide knowledge. Therefore, he was compared with Guo Ziyi, one of the greatest generals and mandarins in Chinese history. Modern opinions still consider Trần Nhật Duật, together with Trần Hưng Đạo and Trần Quang Khải, as the most important members of Trần clan who were credited with the victories over the Yuan dynasty and the prosperous situation in Đại Việt afterwards. A main street in Hanoi and many places in Vietnam are named in honour of Trần Nhật Duật.
