= Trịnh Kiểm =

Trịnh Kiểm 鄭檢
- Trịnh lords Lord of Tonkin
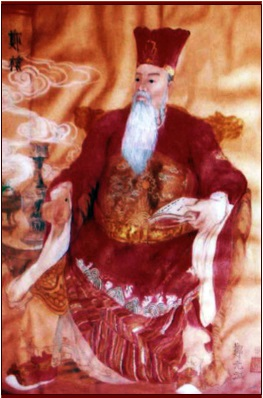

Trịnh Lords
- Reign: 1545–1570
- Predecessor: Position established
- Successor: Trịnh Cối
- Born: 14 September 1503; Yên Định District, Thanh Hóa Province
- Died: 29 March 1570 (aged 66)
- Spouse: Lại Thị Ngọc Trân
- Issue: Trịnh Cối; Trịnh Tùng; 3 more sons and 2 daughters
Names
- Trịnh Kiểm (鄭檢)
Posthumous name
- Minh Khang Thái Vương (明康太王)
Temple name
- Thế Tổ (世祖)
- House: Trịnh lords
- Father: Trịnh Lâu
- Mother: Hoàng Ngọc Dốc
- Religion: Buddhism

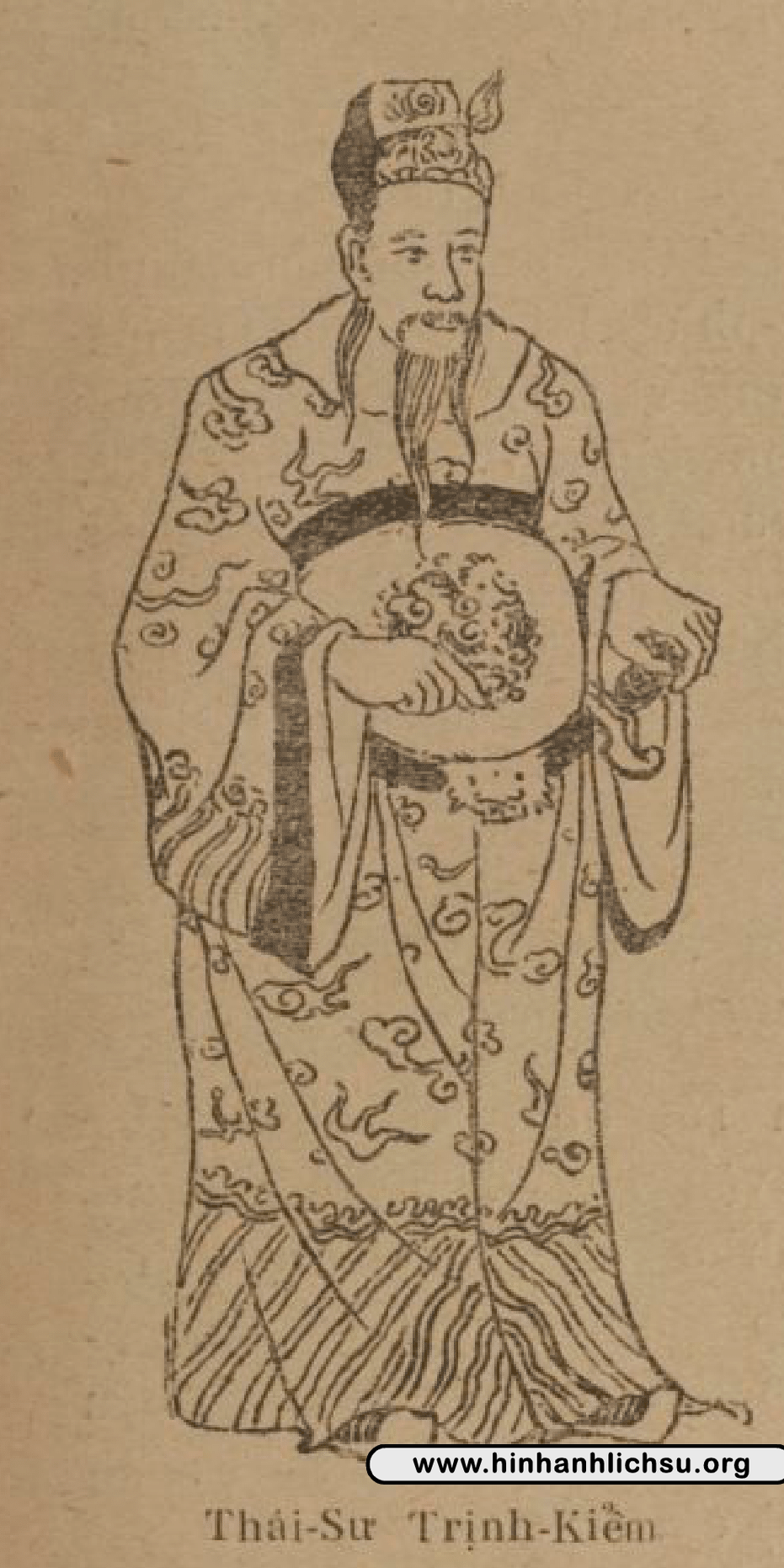
An illustration of Trịnh Kiểm in Trịnh gia chính phả by Trịnh Như Tấu

Trịnh Kiểm (1503–1570) posthumously titled Thế Tổ Minh Khang Thái Vương (世祖明康太王), was an influential political and military figure of Đại Việt during the Southern and Northern Dynasties period. In name, he served as a supporter of the Revival Lê dynasty emperors, but in reality, he was the actual leader of the Southern Dynasty from 1545 onwards. Though his highest title during his lifetime was Thái Quốc Công (Grand Duke of the State), he is often regarded as the first Chúa (Lord) of the Trịnh family. He established his family as hereditary governors of Vietnam, ruling in the name of the figurehead Later Lê emperors.

Trịnh Kiểm was born into a poor family in Vĩnh Lộc now known as modern day Thanh Hoa. During his youth, he witnessed the Mạc Dynasty usurp the Lê throne, leading him to join Grand Duke Nguyễn Kim who was raising an army and war against the Mạc, supporting Lê Trang Tông as emperor. Recognizing Trịnh Kiểm’s exceptional prowess and strategic abilities, Nguyễn Kim married his daughter, Nguyễn Thị Ngọc Bảo, to him, entrusted him with military command, and promoted him to the title Dực Nghĩa Hầu (Marquis). Trịnh Kiểm achieved numerous victories against the Mạc forces. Which led the Emperor Lê Trang Tông himself trusting him greatly, promoting him to Đại tướng quân (Grand General) with the noble title Dực Quận Công (Grand Duke), in 1539 when he was 37 years old.

After his father-in-law Nguyễn Kim’s death in 1545, Trịnh Kiểm took over leadership of the government and military of the Lê Dynasty until his death, serving under three Lê emperors: Lê Trang Tông, Lê Trung Tông, and Lê Anh Tông. He played a major role in organizing the Southern Dynasty’s government through key decisions such as establishing his headquarters in Vạn Lại, holding civil service examinations in Confucian studies, strengthening the military, recruiting individuals based on talent and merit rather than bureaucrats, repelling Mạc invasions in Thanh Hoa and Nghệ An– reclaiming Thuận Hóa and Quảng Nam from Mạc control, and launching major northern campaigns. Although he did not achieve a decisive victory over the Mạc in his lifetime, Trịnh Kiểm laid the foundation for his descendants to complete the restoration of the Lê Dynasty, reclaim Đông Kinh (modern-day Hanoi), and establish the long-lasting Lê-Trịnh era in Vietnamese medieval history. Although he was the de facto ruler of Vietnam, he never assumed a higher position for himself. When he died, his son Trịnh Tùng declared himself a lord and conferred this title posthumously upon his dead father.

== Early life ==
Trịnh Kiểm’s childhood name was Trịnh Phiến (鄭𭪤), later changed to Kiểm. He was born on September 14, 1503 to Trịnh Lâu, and Hoàng Thị Ngọc Dốc, during the Cảnh Thống era of Emperor Lê Hiến Tông. He was the third of seven siblings, with four brothers and two sisters. Trịnh Khả, his great-grandfather was a regent during the reign of child-king Lê Nhân Tông, and was a close ally to Lê Lợi considered to be one of Vietnam’s greatest heroes. His birthplace was his mother’s birthplace the village of Hổ, in Vệ Quốc commune, Yên Định district, Thanh Hoa province. It was said that when he was born, a red light filled the entire room, astonishing the entire village. From a young age, he was known to be intelligent and stood out from others.

When Kiểm was six years old, his father, the family's breadwinner died. This caused his family's financial and social status to deteriorate, and they faced disdain and discrimination from other villagers. As a result, he and his mother had to relocate to the village of Sóc Sơn. To survive, Kiểm worked as a buffalo herder in the Lệ Sơn mountains at a young age. While tending buffalos, he often gathered groups of other village children, where at times due to poverty and hunger they stole chickens and ducks for food. They often played war games—splitting into teams, using the buffalo as war elephants and horses, reeds as banners, practiced fighting armed with knives and salt pots, and organizing different battle formations.

One day he came across a injured buffalo in a nearby area; knowing it was going to die eventually, he killed and cooked it to treat his friends. A villager gathering firewood came across the scene and confronted them. All the children fled except for Kiểm, who remained seated where he was. When questioned, he calmly replied:

“This buffalo broke its leg, so I killed it for food!”

The villagers then accused him of theft, dragged him to the village hall for punishment, where many debated whether to drown him to death in the river or report him to the officials. Ultimately, the village chief decided to expel him and his mother from returning. After being expelled, Kiểm moved to Bồ Xuyên village in Yên Mô district.

At the age of 24 (1526), he married a woman from the Trần family, whose name is recorded as Ngọc Lĩnh. He lived with her in Bồ Xuyên, but historical records do not provide further details about her fate.

=== Stealing his master’s horse ===
In 1527, Dai Viet was in chaos. The ruling Lê dynasty had been overthrown by Mạc Đăng Dung, a former general who seized the throne. Many loyalists of the Lê dynasty refused to accept this change and fled to organise resistance movements. Among them was Nguyễn Kim, a powerful noble who retreated to the remote region of Cổ Lũng (modern-day Cẩm Thủy District) to plan an uprising against the Mạc, and advanced his troops. During this time, a Mạc general named Ninh Bang Hầu established his base in Vĩnh Ninh (Modern day Vĩnh Lộc). His army controlled the surrounding regions, ensuring they retain their loyalty to the new Mạc rulers. Kiểm and his mother sought refuge under Ninh Bang Hầu, hoping for stability and a better life. His mother personally begged the general to take her son into service as a household retainer, pleased with his spirit, he agreed. He assigned Trịnh Kiểm to oversee the farming estates in the hamlet Thọ Liêu where he was responsible for raising livestock, including buffaloes and horses, something he was specialized and experienced in. During his daily routine, Trịnh Kiểm befriended a Cham man who also worked in the estate named Vũ Thì An, who was an expert in training horses. Under his teachings, Trịnh Kiểm also learned how to recognise and train superior horses breeds himself.:

Ambitious, and dissatisfied with his role realizing that he had no real future of progression, one day Kiểm stole the best horse from his master’s stables and fled. Riding at full speed, he crossed the border into Mường Sùng Cổ Lũng (modern-day Bá Thước), which was then part of Ai Lao (Laos) where he intended to join a cousin Trịnh Quang, who was already fighting under the army of Nguyễn Kim’s against the Mạc dynasty. Due to going hastily, he arranged plans for his mother to reunite with him once he was settled down. His mother, however, who was left behind, fled back to her home village in Vệ Quốc knowing Ninh Bang Hau would be sworn with vengeance for this offense. When Ninh Bang Hầu discovered that Kiểm had stolen his horse and fled, he felt betrayed and was enraged. He ordered his soldiers and the villagers of Sóc Sơn and Biện Thượng to hunt down Trịnh Kiểm and his mother no matter what, offering rewards for their capture. After an extensive search, they only managed to capture his mother. Ninh Bang Hầu gave her an ultimatum.

”I will let you go if you find and bring your son Trịnh Kiểm and my horse to me. If you do what I say I will reward you, If you fail, you will not be spared.’”

=== His mother’s execution ===
After searching, his mother found Kiểm where she decided they needed to go into hiding immediately. They hid at her brother’s house in the village of Biện Thượng. However, when the village chief discovered them, much to their surprise, instead of turning him in, feeling pity, he chose to help Kiểm. After discussing a plan among them, one night seeing a good opportunity, he threw a rock which signaled for Kiềm to escape. He quickly crawled through several layers of fences then fled to the home of a contact named Nữu in Yên Định. Nữu concealed Trịnh Kiểm by placing him into a large grain bin and covering it with rice where he was to be transported out the region. When Kiểm later in life rose to power, Nữu had already died. In gratitude for his past kindness, Kiểm rewarded Nữu’s family with a great pension for ancestral offerings and daily expenses. Despite these efforts, the villagers eventually recaptured Kiểm’s elderly mother and handed her over to Ninh Bang Hầu. Three days later, he forced the village of Sóc Sơn to place her in a bamboo cage, weighing it down with a large rock, and throwing it into the river where she drowned a slow and humiliating death. Kiểm’s close friend from the estate, Vũ Thì An, learned of the execution and immediately sent his son, Vũ Đình Tùng, to inform Kiểm. At first, Kiểm feared it was a trap, but when he realized the truth, he was devastated. Overcome with grief, he wept and swore:

“How could my fellow villagers be so heartless and betray me like this? If I ever build a great kingdom, I swear never to return to my old village.”

He then turned to Vũ Đình Tùng and said:

”Me and your father have been as close as liver and gall; given such a bond, I shall speak at length. You must spare no effort to find my mother’s remains. See that they are buried in a place well hidden. If Heaven grants me success in the future, your service shall not go unrewarded. Whatever you desire, ask freely and I shall see it done.”

:

Early one morning, a fisherman named Mai, who had moved from Đông Biện village to Ngạn Thượng village, spotted a body floating in the river. He went home to fetch a hoe to bury it, but when he returned, he saw something mysterious—a swarm of termites had gathered around the corpse, forming what looked like a burial mound. Word of this reached Kiểm, who—along with his cousin Trịnh Quáng and loyal friends Trịnh Bá Di and Vũ Thì An—retrieved his mother’s body and performed funeral rites. Fearing that Mạc soldiers would desecrate her grave, he had Vũ Thì An and his son wrap the body in a mat and secretly transport it through the Đường Cán Mountains to a hidden burial site in Đồng Rạng (Yên Việt Village) to rebury.

== Military Career, Following Nguyễn Kim ==
After Mạc Đăng Dung usurped the throne, the descendants of Lê dynasty officials and loyal members, especially those from Thanh Hoa, refused to accept his rule and continuously rebelled. Nguyen Kim—a noble from a prestigious family that had served the Lê dynasty for generations—fled to Ai Lao (modern-day Laos) to gather troops and plan the restoration of the Lê dynasty. By 1533, Nguyễn Kim placed the son of Emperor Lê Chiêu Tông on the throne, naming him Lê Trang Tông. The new emperor granted Nguyễn Kim the title Thái sư Hưng Quốc Công (Grand Duke). This marked the beginning of the conflict between the Southern Court (Lê-Nguyễn forces) and the Northern Court (Mạc dynasty).

Kim stationed his forces in Mường Sùng, a region in Ai Lao. During this time, Kiểm had already joined Kim’s army and was already gaining a reputation as a renowned and skilled warrior who was quickly rising in the ranks. Kim summoned him one day and began questioning him, seeing that Kiểm was articulate, brilliant, and exceptionally courageous, Kim quickly recognized his potential. Eventually, Kim appointed Kiểm as Tri Mã Cơ a (Commander of the Cavalry), placing him in charge of the military’s horses and entrusted him with leading soldiers into battle. Kiểm and his forces stationed themselves in Vạn Lại and achieved a great victory against the Mạc army. According to “History of the Kingdom of Đàng Ngoài” (Lịch sử vương quốc Đàng Ngoài) by Alexandre de Rhodes, when Mạc forces launched a massive attack on the capital, Kim and his army found themselves trapped in an enemy siege. In desperation, Kim made a promise:

“I will marry my daughter to whoever can break through the enemy lines and rescue me and my men!”

Trịnh Kiểm mounted his horse and charged fearlessly into battle, cutting down enemy soldiers one after another and opened a path for Kim’s army to escape. Keeping his word, Kim married his daughter Princess Ngọc Bảo to Kiểm and assigned him more important military duties, especially the training of cavalry for the resistance forces. In 1539, Kiểm was assigned to escort Emperor Lê Trang Tông back to Vietnam from Ai Lao. Having himself heard of Kiểm’s extraordinary prowess and victories, Lê Trang Tông promoted him to Đại Tướng Quân (Grand General) and granted him the title Dực Quận Công (Duke). At that time, Kiểm was 37 years old. The emperor viewed him as a trusted individual and in high esteem, granting him the military seal and placing him in charge of battles against the Mạc dynasty in Thanh Hoa Province. Kiểm later secured a major victory against the Mạc forces at Lôi Dương.

After these successes, Kiểm returned to his hometown to hold a grand banquet and pay respects to his ancestors. Duke, Lại Thế Vinh, the elder brother of Kiểm’s second wife Lại Ngọc Trân, gifted him lands in Yên Hoằng Commune to build a residence and military base. In 1540, Nguyễn Kim led his army to Nghệ An, expanding their influence. His growing reputation caused many local forces to surrender without resistance. The following year (1541), Mạc Đăng Dung died. Seizing the opportunity, Kim’s forces launched an offensive, capturing Thanh Hóa and Nghệ An. By 1543, they had successfully recaptured Tây Đô (modern-day Thanh Hóa Province) from the Mạc dynasty.

== Obtaining the Reins of Power ==
In 1545, a former general of the Mạc dynasty, Dương Chấp Nhất, poisoned Nguyễn Kim, killing him. Before his death, Nguyễn Kim entrusted full military command to Kiểm because his two sons, Nguyễn Uông and Nguyễn Hoàng, were still too young to lead. With Kim’s passing, all military power of the Lê dynasty ultimately fell into the hands of him.

Later that year, in August of the lunar calendar, Mạc Phúc Hải, the emperor of the Northern Court, ordered his General Mạc Phúc Tư to launch a surprise attack on Lê Trang Tông’s headquarters. As Mạc forces advanced to the Phù Chẩn River, Lê Trang Tông personally led his army to face them. Kiểm, serving as Commander-in-Chief of the Imperial Army, led the vanguard forces. Where his army crushed the Mạc forces, killing a devastating number of enemy soldiers. General Phuc Tu fled back to the north in defeat. Later that year (1545), Emperor Lê Trang Tông granted Trịnh Kiểm the rank and title of:

“Đô Tướng Tiết Chế Các Dinh Quân Thủy Bộ Các Xứ Kiêm Tổng Nội Ngoại Bình Chương Quân Quốc Trọng Sự” (The Supreme Commander of All Land and Naval Forces, Grand Minister of State Affairs).

He was also granted the noble rank of Thái Sư (Grand Mentor) and the title Lượng Quốc Công (Duke of Lượng).

From that point onward, Kiểm held absolute control over the Lê dynasty’s military and political affairs. Even though Emperor Lê Trang Tông remained on the throne, all important decisions—such as military campaigns and government appointments—were made by Kiểm first, and the emperor would only approve them afterward. This marked the beginning of Kiểm’s dominance over Vietnam, eventually leading to the establishment of the Trịnh Lords, who were the real rulers of Dai Viet for the next two centuries.

== Pillar of the Southern Court, Manipulating Power ==
In 1546, Kiểm withdrew his troops to Thanh Hóa, established a temporary royal court for Lê Trang Tông in Vạn Lại, and began recruiting brave and skilled warriors, training soldiers in mass, stockpiling provisions, and strategizing for battles against the Mạc dynasty. At this time, Đại Việt was divided into two regions: from Thanh Hóa southward was under the rule of the Lê dynasty, commanded by Trịnh Kiểm; from Sơn Nam northward belonged to the Mạc dynasty, known as the Northern Court. Whenever military campaigns were launched, Kiểm led them and was victorious wherever he fought. As a result, many warriors seeking glory, honor, prestige, from Hoan and Diễn (Nghệ An, Ô (Thừa Thiên, Huế), and Quảng (Quảng Nam, Đà Nẵng) flocked to join him, including notable figures such as Phùng Khắc Khoan, Lương Hữu Khánh, Đinh Bạt Tuỵ, Nguyễn Khải Khang, Nguyễn Thiến, and Lê Khắc Thận. The land of Ái Châu (Thanh Hóa) gradually stabilized.

During the reign of Lê Thái Tổ the country was divided into five military districts: The Eastern District, Southern District, Western District, Northern District, and Hải Tây District. By the time of Lê Thánh Tông, the country was reorganized into 13 administrative provinces. When Mạc Đăng Dung usurped the Lê throne, the entire country fell under Mạc rule, except for 11 military districts in Tuyên Quang, which were controlled by Vũ Văn Mật. Later, when Nguyễn Kim launched his campaign, he first captured Ái Châu (Thanh Hóa) and gradually took control of the southern territories, including Châu Hoan, Diễn, and Ô Lý (Nghệ An, Thuận Hóa). This resulted in Vietnam being divided into two rival dynasties, the Mạc and the Lê Restoration. Tuyên Quang, under the leadership of Vũ Văn Mật, pledged allegiance to the Lê-Trịnh faction.

According to The History of the Kingdom of Đàng Ngoài, all power was in the hands of Trịnh Kiểm, while the emperor had no real authority:

“In reality, he (Trịnh Kiểm) intended to restore the lost provinces, but not to return them to the emperor—a ruler whom he considered incapable of governing, weak, untalented, and indulgent. Instead, he sought to claim them for himself and his descendants. Because he was highly knowledgeable in state affairs, respected and admired. The emperor trusted him and granted him authority not only over the military but over all matters of governance. Thus, all military command was placed in his hands, and all affairs—whether war or peace—were entirely under his control. As a result, due to military and customary power, the emperor had no real authority, holding only the title of king, while all armed forces and governance rested in the hands of the general.” — Alexandre de Rhodes

In 1556, Emperor Trung Tông died without an heir. At that time, the main Lê royal bloodline had ended, prompting royal officials to discuss the matter. Some suggested selecting a descendant from the emperor’s maternal family, while others insisted that the throne should remain within the Lê paternal bloodline. Kiểm then ordered a search for Lê descendants, eventually finding Lê Duy Bang, a fourth-generation descendant of Lê Trừ (the elder brother of Lê Thái Tổ), who was living in the village of Bố Vệ, in Đông Sơn. Trịnh Kiểm brought him back and enthroned him as Lê Anh Tông. During Trịnh Kiểm’s rule, the Lê Restoration Court only held two Confucian scholar examinations in 1554 and 1565. Regarding the military system, Trịnh Kiểm maintained the previous military structure, establishing five Đô đốc military commands and organizing troops into five military camps, each with different ranks and divisions. However, recruitment was limited to soldiers from Thanh Hóa and Nghệ An only.

== The Pacification of Thuận Quảng ==
In 1554, Kiểm moved King Lê’s temporary court to Biện Thượng. Seeing an opportunity with morale high, he ordered his generals to launch a military campaign to reclaim Hóa Châu in the south. This region was controlled by a Mạc general, Hoàng Bôi. The Southern Court’s army defeated and killed Hoàng Bôi, securing control over Hóa Châu, which included the provinces of Thuận Hóa and Quảng Nam. Afterward, Grand Chancellor Kiểm appointed local leaders and officials to restore order, ensuring stability in the newly reclaimed lands.

By October 1558, Kiểm proposed a long-term strategy to King Anh Tông. He believed securing the southern region would allow him to focus entirely on defeating the Mạc dynasty in the north. In his petition, he argued that Thuận Hóa was a crucial military stronghold with a resilient population and abundant resources. He recommended appointing Nguyễn Hoàng, a capable and level-headed leader, as the governor of the region. The king agreed, granting Nguyễn Hoàng full control over Thuận Hóa, except for the requirement to send annual taxes to the royal court. From this point on, Nguyễn Hoàng worked alongside Bùi Tá Hán, the governor of Quảng Nam, to defend the southeastern frontier of the Lê dynasty’s stronghold.

“The region of Thuận Hóa is a reservoir of elite soldiers. In the early days of our dynasty, we relied on the people of this region to suppress the Wu invaders. This land is mountainous and rugged, its people strong and resolute, and it possesses abundant resources from both the forests and the sea. It is a vital region without equal. It has taken decades of military efforts to reclaim it. Thus, we must protect it at all costs and make it a solid defensive barrier…

I have observed that Nguyễn Hoàng, is a composed and determined man, possessing both strategy and leadership. He is tolerant and humble with his soldiers. I propose appointing him as the regional governor to maintain order at the frontier, defend against northern invaders, and coordinate with Trấn Quận Công in Quảng Nam to reinforce each other…”

— Trịnh Kiểm

In March 1568, Bùi Tá Hán died, and Kiểm appointed Nguyễn Bá Quýnh, a general from Nghệ An, to take his place as the region’s military commander. By 1569, King Lê Anh Tông formally recognized Trịnh Kiểm’s power, bestowing upon him the titles of Supreme General and Grand Duke, as well as the honorary title Supreme Father of the kingdom. By this time, Trịnh Kiểm’s influence had completely overshadowed the royal court. Though he had not yet recaptured the capital, his leadership was instrumental in restoring the Lê dynasty. His growing power also marked the beginning of the Trịnh family’s rule as hereditary warlords (Chúa).

Later that year, Nguyễn Hoàng traveled from Thuận Hóa to Thanh Hoa to visit the king and pay respects to Trịnh Kiểm. Their meeting was warm and friendly, with Trịnh Kiểm advising him:

“The kingdom has entrusted you with a great responsibility. You must remain loyal and continue to dedicate yourself fully to protecting the dynasty.”

== War with the Mac Dynasty ==
In 1546, the Northern emperor Mạc Phúc Hải died, and his son Mạc Phúc Nguyên took the throne. However, because Phúc Nguyên was still young, factions within the court began plotting to overthrow him. Feeling unsafe, he abandoned the main royal palace in Thăng Long and moved outside the city, throwing the capital into chaos.

After Emperor Lê Trang Tông of the Southern court died in 1548, his son Lê Trung Tông, still a child, ascended the throne. Because of the king’s youth, General Kiểm chose to focus on stabilizing the regions and protecting the people rather than launching any major northern campaigns. As a result, both sides of the conflict briefly experienced peace, and the people enjoyed a few years of stability. In 1550, Northern grand chancellor Lê Bá Ly, after being slandered at court, defected from the Mạc and surrendered to the Southern Lê court, following him over 13,000 troops from Sơn Tây and Sơn Nam. He also wrote letters encouraging other northern advisors and generals, like Nguyễn Hữu Liêu and Đặng Huấn, to follow his lead. According to historian Lê Quý Đôn in ‘Kiến Văn Tiểu Lục’, this marked the beginning of the Mạc Dynasty’s decline and the rise of the Lê army’s reputation.

In 1551, Trịnh Kiểm assigned Lê Bá Ly to attack Sơn Nam and Vũ Văn Mật to attack Tuyên Quang, then convened with them in Thăng Long. Before the campaign, he wrote a letter in the Nôm script, urging everyone to remember King Lê Thái Tổ’s past efforts in expelling the Ming invaders and gaining independence for Vietnam, to now once again unite in supporting the Lê king and eliminate the Mac usurpers.

The three generals launched simultaneous attacks. In 1552, Trịnh Kiểm led troops to suppress the southwestern region, and Mạc general Nguyễn Khải Khang surrendered. After capturing the citadel, he withdrew to Tây Đô to avoid a surprise attack from Mạc reinforcements. In May 1552, Trịnh Kiểm launched an offensive from Hủng Hoá, crossing the Thao River to An Lạc. He defeated Mạc troops commanded by Prince Khiêm, Mạc Kính Điển. He then advanced to Xuân Canh Lâm Hạ, winning several more battles. Mạc Phúc Nguyên, frightened, fled to Kim Thành. (Note: Nay thuộc huyện Kim Thành, tỉnh Hải Duơng) The Lê army entered Đông Kinh and held a banquet to reward the soldiers. They captured several prefectures in the Sơn Tây and Sơn Nam regions; the Mạc retained only the Eastern and Northern routes. Nguyễn Khải Khang and Lê Bá Ly proposed bringing the emperor back to Thăng Long, but Trịnh Kiểm believed the Mạc were still strong and public sentiment hadn’t fully shifted to the Lê. Therefore, he didn’t sign the petition. Upon reading the petition and understanding Trịnh Kiểm’s intentions, the king ordered a retreat. Mạc Phúc Nguyên, upon hearing of the Southern army’s withdrawal, dispatched troops to pursue them at Nam Công Mountain. However, Trịnh Kiểm defeated the Mạc pursuers and returned to Thanh Hoa. From then on, Đông Kinh and the Sơn Tây and Sơn Nam regions reverted to Mạc control.

By August 1555, the Northern court regained strength. Emperor Mạc Phúc Nguyên ordered Mạc Kính Điển to invade Thanh Hoa, appointing Duke Thọ as commander of the Southern route army, leading 100 warships as the vanguard, advancing straight to the Thần Phù estuary. (Note: Ngày nay đã bị phù sa bồi đắp và trở thành vùng đất nằm cách bờ biển hơn 10 km, thuộc ranh giới giữa 2 xã Yên Lâm, Yên Mô, Ninh Bình và Nga Điền, Nga Sơn, Thanh Hóa. Khu vực Thần Phù nay ở thượng nguồn lưu vực sông Càn, con sông cùng với dãy núi Tam Điệp là ranh giới giữa 2 miền Trung - Bắc Việt Nam.) Sau Mạc Kính Điển hội quân đóng ở sông Đại Lại, (Note: Tức sông Lèn, một nhánh của sông Mã.) Later, Mạc Kính Điển’s forces camped at the Đại Lại River, assigning Duke Thọ to station at Kim Sơn. Prince Khiêm, Mạc Kính Điển, was a formidable opponent to Duke Lượng, Trịnh Kiểm, and the Lê–Trịnh faction. As acknowledged by Lê historians in the “Đại Việt Sử ký Toàn thư”: “Kính Điển was benevolent, brave, intelligent, resourceful, perceptive, experienced in hardships, diligent, and loyal.

Trịnh Kiểm convened a meeting with his generals:

The enemy relies on their numbers to underestimate us; we will use ambush tactics to wait for them, and we will surely capture them.

He instructed the villagers on both riverbanks to remain calm. He personally led troops to set up ambushes at Bạch Thạch Mountain (Note: Tên một ngọn núi ở phía tây bắc huyện Đông Sơn, Thanh Hóa.) phía Bắc Sông, lại sai binh tượng hùng mạnh mai phục dưới núi Kim Sơn, lại sai Thái úy Hùng quốc công Đình Công đốc suất các tướng cũ của Nhà Mạc đầu hàng quân Nam triều là Lê Bá Ly, Nguyễn Khải Khang,... cùng quân bản bộ mai phục ở phía nam sông. Từ núi Yên Định cho tới núi Quân Yên, (Note: Nay thuộc huyện Yên Định, tỉnh Thanh Hóa) north of the river, deployed strong elephant troops to ambush at the foot of Kim Sơn Mountain, and ordered Grand Marshal Duke Hùng, Đinh Công, to lead former Mạc generals who had defected to the Southern court, such as Lê Bá Ly and Nguyễn Khải Khang, along with their troops, to ambush south of the river. From Yên Định Mountain to Quân Yên Mountain, he assigned Phạm Đốc and Nguyễn Quyện to lead naval forces to occupy the upper reaches from the Hữu Chấp River to the Kim Bôi River to create a strategic advantage. As the Mạc army passed through Kim Sơn to Ông Tập market, they remained overconfident, unguarded, and their troops were known for playing music and singing, as if entering an uninhabited area.

At noon, Đinh Công and Lê Bá Ly signaled with seven cannon shots, launching their attack; troops and war elephants from the lower river crossed to intercept the Mạc rear guard, while the upper river naval forces attacked the front, and troops from all sides overwhelmed the Mạc army. Duke Thọ had to jump into the river and was captured alive by Duke Triều, Vũ Sư Thước. Mạc general Vạn Đôn Hầu and several dozen officers drowned; Kính Điển gathered the remnants and retreated to Thăng Long. Trịnh Kiểm reported the victory to King Lê Trung Tông. The king ordered the execution of Duke Thọ and several dozen other Mạc generals at Đồng Lộc Mountain.

In July 1557, Mạc Phúc Nguyên ordered Mạc Kính Điển to attack Thanh Hoa again, assigning generals Phạm Quỳnh and Phạm Dao to lead naval forces across the sea to attack Nghệ An. Mạc Kính Điển’s naval forces reached the Thần Phù River and Tống Sơn, (Note: Nay thuộc huyện Hà Trung, tỉnh Thanh Hóa) Nga Sơn (Note: Nay là huyện Nga Sơn, tỉnh Thanh Hóa) Nga Sơn regions, burning all floating bridges of the Southern court. Trịnh Kiểm stationed Duke Thanh at Nga Sơn and Duke Thụy at Tống Sơn, preventing the Mạc army from advancing. Trịnh Kiểm personally led troops, secretly moving along Yên Mô Mountain to the estuary, launching an attack on the Mạc army’s rear, trapping them. During the battle, Trịnh Kiểm ordered Vũ Lăng Hầu, Phạm Đức Kỳ of Hoằng Hóa, to lead the vanguard. Encountering Mạc Kính Điển’s ship, Phạm Đức Kỳ leaped onto it, drew his sword, and cut the umbrella bearer in half, causing the body to fall into the river. Kính Điển, caught off guard, jumped into the river to escape. The Mạc army was defeated, with soldiers fleeing into the mountains; the Southern court captured many weapons. Mạc Kính Điển swam into a cave in Trị Nội village, Yên Mô district, hiding for three days without food. One night, seeing a banana tree floating by the cave entrance, he clung to it, swam back, and fortunately reached Trinh Nữ wharf in Yên Mô, where someone rescued him, allowing him to return safely.

== Succession ==
In 1569, in failing health, Trịnh Kiểm passed power to his eldest son, Trịnh Coi. In 1570, Trịnh Kiểm died. In the same year, Trịnh Coi was defeated by a Mạc army and was replaced by his younger, more capable brother, Trịnh Tùng.

== See also ==
- Lê dynasty
- List of Vietnamese dynasties

== Notes ==
Vietnamese royalty
Military commander established	Trịnh lords Lord of Tonkin; 1545–1569	Succeeded by Trịnh Cối
