= 中宗 =

中宗 may refer to several Chinese, Korean and Vietnamese monarchs.

- See Jungjong of Joseon for Korean monarch
- See Lê Trung Tông (disambiguation) for Vietnamese monarchs
- See Zhongzong (disambiguation) for Chinese monarchs
