= Lê Anh Tông =

Lê Anh Tông 黎英宗
- Emperor of Đại Việt

Emperor of Revival Lê dynasty
- Reign: 1556–1573
- Predecessor: Lê Trung Tông
- Successor: Lê Thế Tông
- Regent: Trịnh Kiểm (1556–1570); Trịnh Cối (1570); Trịnh Tùng (1570–1573)
- Born: 1532
- Died: 22 January 1573 (Age 41)
- Burial: Bố Vệ lăng or Thổ Lăng
- Issue: Lê Bách; Lê Lựu; Lê Ngạnh; Lê Tùng; Lê Thế Tông
Names
- Lê Duy Bang (黎維邦)
Era name and dates
- Thiên Hựu (天祐): 1557; Chính Trị (正治): 1558–1571; Hồng Phúc (洪福): 1572
Posthumous name
- Tuấn Hoàng đế (峻皇帝)
Temple name
- Anh Tông (英宗)
- House: Lê dynasty
- Father: Lê Duy Khoáng

Lê Anh Tông (chữ Hán: 黎英宗; 1532–1573), posthumous name Tuấn Hoàng đế (峻皇帝) birth name Lê Duy Bang (黎維邦) was the 12th emperor of Vietnamese Later Lê dynasty, ruling nation's south realm from 1556 to 1573 during the Lê-Mạc war. Through his reign, Anh Tông was just a nominal emperor of south Đại Việt, with actual governing and military power possessed by the Trịnh, a warrior house from Thanh Hóa. Although the Lê house was namely the main enemy of the Mạc house in the north, Lê troops fighting the northerners were actually commanded by Trịnh warlords. Lê Anh Tông eventually grew hostile against those warlords, who he saw as occupying too much power. The emperor made a plot against one of them, Prime Minister Trịnh Tùng. The plot failed at the cost of Anh Tông's life. However, after Anh Tông's death, Trịnh Tùng decided to maintain the Lê imperial house by keeping Anh Tông's youngest son Lê Duy Đàm (Lê Thế Tông) as figurehead emperor.

== Biography ==
Lê Duy Bang was born in 1532 in Thanh Hóa. According to the Đại Việt sử ký toàn thư, the official historical chronicle of Đại Việt under the Revival Lê dynasty, he was the fourth generation descendant of Lê Trừ, the second brother of Lê Thái Tổ, the Lê dynasty's founding emperor. It was recorded that Duy Bang's father was Lê Duy Khoáng and his mother was an unnamed woman from Thanh Hóa. In 1556, emperor Lê Trung Tông died at an early age without any heir. That spelled the extinction of Lê Thái Tổ's direct lineage. Grand Chancellor Trịnh Kiểm, who had been the virtual ruler of south Đại Việt since the reign of Lê Trang Tông, decided to select Duy Bang as the new emperor.

Since 1533, Đại Việt entered a fierce civil war that divided the nation into two parts. The territory from Chinese border to Thanh Hóa was governed by the Mạc dynasty. The realm from Thanh Hóa to Thuận Hóa was nominally ruled by Lê emperors, with actual authority exerted by Generalissimo Nguyễn Kim, and, after Kim's death in 1545, his son-in-law Trịnh Kiểm. Therefore, having become emperor, Lê Anh Tông/Lê Duy Bang had to cooperate with Trịnh Kiểm in conducting the war with the Mạc house in order to unite Vietnam. With the help of Trịnh Kiểm and capable general, Lê Cập Đệ, emperor Anh Tông achieved several victories against the Mạc forces. However, the Mạc army guided by Mạc Kính Điển, an exceptionally talented prince and military leader, managed to hold large portions of the north. The constant battles between the two imperial houses caused heavy damage to the agricultural economy of Đại Việt. In 1565, Anh Tông organized an imperial examination to select Confucianist scholars as civil officials. Ten scholars passed the examination at highest grades.

In 1570, Trịnh Kiểm died. Anh Tông appointed Kiểm's eldest son, Trịnh Cối as Generalissimo, controlling both the government and army of the Lê realm. Trịnh Cối soon proved to be an incompetent ruler, and was overthrown by his younger brother Trịnh Tùng. Under the resourceful command of Trịnh Tùng and Lê Cập Đệ, Lê forces repelled an offensive of Mạc Kính Điển in Thanh Hóa lowlands in 1570.

In spring 1571, Lê Anh Tông appointed Trịnh Tùng as prime minister. In the same year, the northern court ordered Mạc Kính Điển to invade Nghệ An while another Mạc general conducted an amphibious offensive on Thuận Hóa, the Lê realm's extreme south prefecture, in order to open a second battlefront against the Lê dynasty. Mac forces landed on Thuận Hóa but were utterly defeated by general Nguyễn Hoàng, Trịnh Tùng's uncle-in-law. On the Nghệ An front, Lê Anh Tông's forces led by Trịnh Tùng managed to repulse Mạc Kính Điển's army. Lê Anh Tông and Trịnh Tùng defeated another offensive of Mạc Kính Điển in 1572.

Throughout his 16 years reign, Emperor Lê Anh Tông changed his era name three times. The era names he used were respectively Thiên Hựu (天祐; 1557), Chính Trị (正治; 1558–1571) and Hồng Phúc (洪福; 1572–1573).

In 1573, Anh Tông began to feel uneasy at the fact that Trịnh Tùng governed every aspect of the state. The emperor cooperated with Lê Cập Đệ to make a plot against Trịnh Tùng. The plot failed and Trịnh Tùng promptly killed Lê Cập Đệ. Anh Tông abandoned the imperial capital, Vạn Lại (Thanh Hóa) and escaped with his four eldest sons Bách, Lựu, Ngạnh and Tùng to Nghệ An. Trịnh Tùng organized a council with state ministers to announce that emperor had listened to unworthy persons and left the state in chaos. As Tùng claimed, the nation could not survive for even one day without an emperor, so Tùng decided to find the 5 year old youngest son of Anh Tông, Lê Duy Đàm, and raised Đàm to the throne. That was emperor Lê Thế Tông. In the next move, Tùng ordered his trusted lieutenants to come to Nghệ An and persuade Anh Tông to return to the capital. On his way to the capital, Lê Anh Tông was assassinated by Tùng's protégé Tống Đức Vị. The court, guided by Trịnh Tùng, officially announced that Anh Tông had committed suicide. The emperor died at 42 years old and was buried in the Bố Vệ mausoleum, Thanh Hóa. It was after his death that he was given temple name Anh Tông (英宗) and posthumous name Tuấn Hoàng đế (峻皇帝).

Preceded by Lê Trang Tông	Emperor of Đại Việt; 1556–1573	Succeeded by Lê Thế Tông
