= Northern and Southern Courts period (disambiguation) =

Northern and Southern Courts period may refer to:

- Northern and Southern dynasties (南北朝, period in China, from 386 to 589
- Northern and Southern States period (남북국시대; 南北國時代) in Korea, from 698 to 926
- Nanboku-chō period (南北朝時代) in Japan, from 1336 to 1392.
- Northern and Southern dynasties (Vietnam) (南北朝, Nam-Bắc triều), period in Vietnam from 1533 to 1592
