= Bá Thước =

- Commune
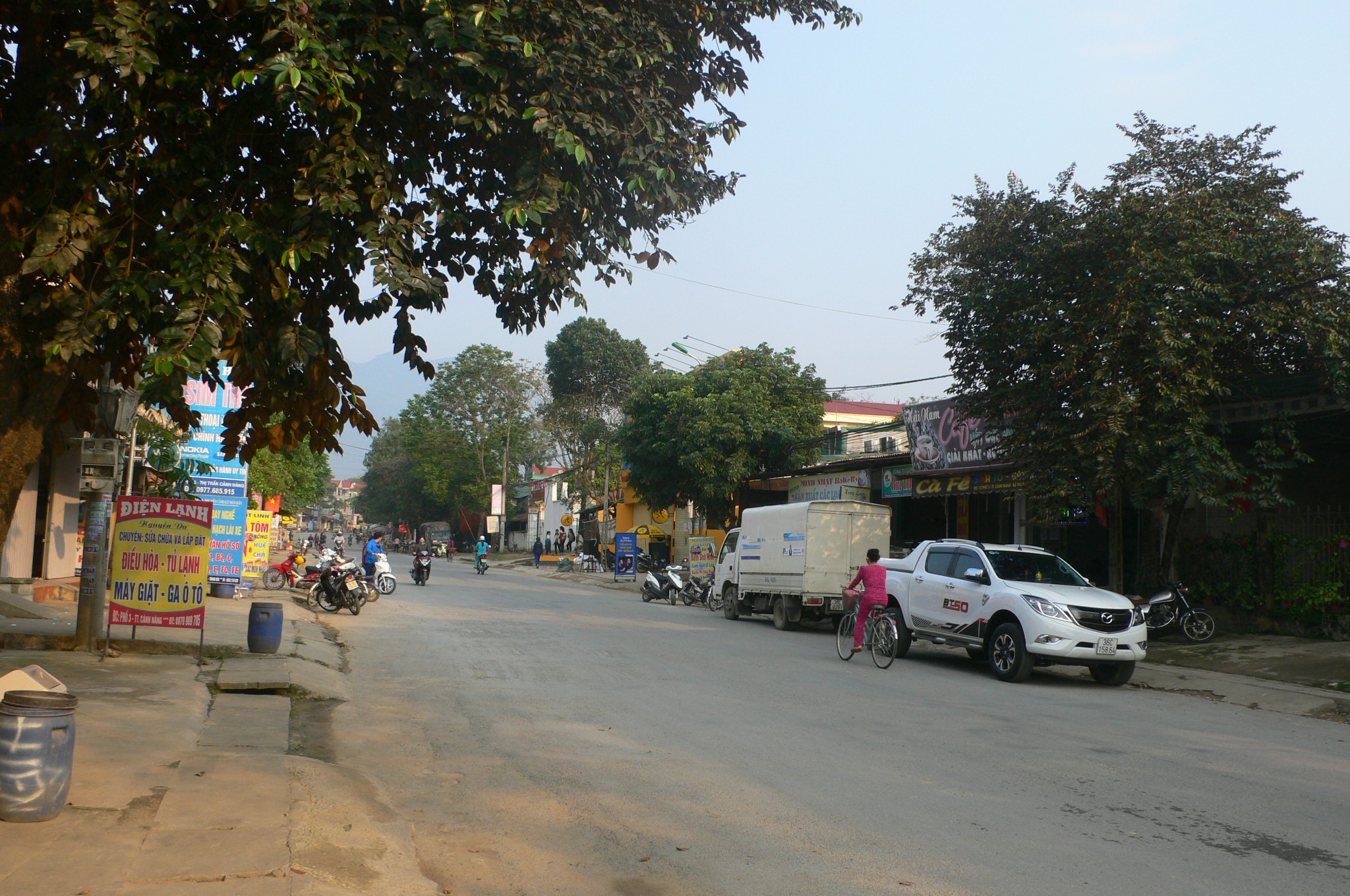
- A view of the Cành Nàng area
- Interactive map of Bá Thước
- Coordinates: 20.352814355668887°N 105.22243384242663°E
- Country: Vietnam
- Region: North Central Coast
- Province: Thanh Hóa
- Established: 16 June 2025
- Administrative headquarters: Cành Nàng Hamlet

Area
  - Total: 106.10 km^{2} (40.97 sq mi)

Population (2024)
  - Total: 21,442
  - Density: 202/km^{2} (520/sq mi)
- Postal code: 41429
- Website: bathuoc.thanhhoa.gov.vn

Bá Thước is a commune in Thanh Hóa province, Vietnam. The commune inherited its name from the former Bá Thước district, which was named after Cầm Bá Thước, a leader of an anti-French insurgent force in the late 19th century.

On 16 June 2025, Bá Thước district was dissolved as part of the 2025 Vietnamese administrative reform, which abolished the district-level administrative system. Bá Thước Commune was established under Resolution No. 1686/NQ-UBTVQH15 of the Standing Committee of the National Assembly of Vietnam, through the merger of the entire area and population of Cành Nàng township and Ban Công and Hạ Trung communes.
