= Trịnh–Nguyễn War =

Civil war between feudal clans in Vietnam

- Part of Civil wars in Vietnam
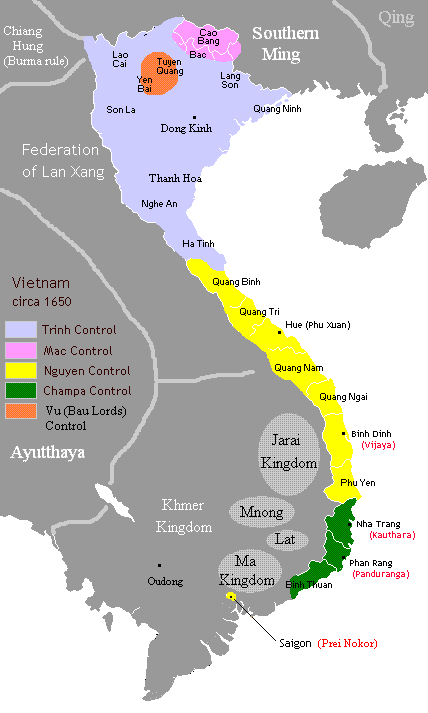
- Map of Vietnam circa 1650 Nguyễn's domain Lê dynasty under Trịnh's control Mạc as rump state Kingdom of Champa
Date	1627–1672 (intermittent); 1774–1775
Location	Vietnam
Result	1627–1672: indecisive 15 November 1774–1775: Trịnh – Tây Sơn's victory
Territorial changes	Trịnh captured Phú Xuân in 1775; Nguyễn retreated to Quảng Nam, and later to Gia Định; Tây Sơn rebellion emerge Beginning of the Tây Sơn wars.

Belligerents
Trịnh lords Dutch East India Company	Nguyễn lords Portuguese Empire	Tây Sơn peasant revolt (1771–1775)

Commanders and leaders
Trịnh Tráng; Trịnh Tạc; Trịnh Căn; Lê Văn Hiểu; Đào Quang Nhiêu (Dutch East India Company) Pieter Baeck † (Dutch East India Company) Jan Erntsen †; 1774–1775: Trịnh Sâm; Hoàng Ngũ Phúc	Nguyễn Phúc Nguyên; Nguyễn Phúc Lan; Nguyễn Phúc Tần; Đào Duy Từ; Nguyễn Hữu Tiến; Nguyễn Hữu Dật; Tôn Thất Hiệp; 1774–1775: Nguyễn Phúc Thuần	Nguyễn Huệ; Nguyễn Nhạc; Nguyễn Lữ

The Trịnh–Nguyễn War (Vietnamese: Trịnh–Nguyễn phân tranh; chữ Hán: 鄭阮紛爭, lit. Trịnh–Nguyễn contention) was a civil war and conflict during the 17th–18th centuries waged between the two ruling families in Vietnam, the Trịnh lords of Đàng Ngoài and the Nguyễn lords of Đàng Trong, centered in what later is Central Vietnam. The wars resulted in a stalemate and century of peace before conflicts resumed in 1774 resulting in the emergence of the Tây Sơn forces following Trịnh Lords at the time, Nguyễn Lords collapsed in Saigon in 1777. During the division of Vietnam, Gianh River was used as the de facto border between both sides in peacetime.

== Origins ==
Both the Trịnh and Nguyễn families were descended from aides, namely Trịnh Kiểm (who is a son-in-law of Nguyễn Kim) and Nguyễn Kim himself, to the hero-Emperor Lê Lợi who liberated Đại Việt from Chinese rule of Ming dynasty and started the Lê dynasty in 1428. By 1520 a succession of weak emperors had brought the country into a state of civil war (see Lê dynasty's civil war). For the next 20 years the Trịnh and Nguyễn clans fought as allies against the usurper Mạc Đăng Dung to restore Đại Việt under rule of Lê Emperor. When Lê dynasty was restored in 1533, the Mạc dynasty had to retreat to Cao Bang. Nguyễn Kim, the father of the first Nguyễn lords, married his daughter to his subordinate Trịnh Kiểm, the first of Trịnh lords. Thus the Trịnh lords and Nguyễn lords are blood related.

== Partition ==
The prime mover in the period from 1525 onwards was Nguyen Kim. His daughter married the young head of the Trịnh family Trinh Kiem. Around 1530, Le dynasty loyalist rebels were forced into exile in Lan Xang and they gathered a new army and captured some southern provinces of Dai Viet. In 1545, Nguyen Kim and subsequently his eldest son Nguyễn Uông was assassinated. Nguyen Kim's son-in-law, Trinh Kiem, then took control over the Royal army. In 1558, Trịnh Kiểm gave the rulership over the southernmost province of Quang Nam to Nguyen Hoang, his wife's brother and the second son of Nguyen Kim. The suspicious causes of his father's and brother's deaths, as well as his brother's subsequent takeover, probably caused bitter resentment in Nguyen Hoang and the later rivalry between the two families. For the next 55 years, Nguyen Hoang ruled Quang Nam. He gradually asserted his control over the province and extended his control south into the remaining Champa lands. Periodically, he sent military forces north to help the Trinh in their long fight against the Mạc dynasty. In 1570 Trinh Kiem died and was succeeded by his second son Trinh Tung, a leader who captured Hanoi from the Mạc king in 1572. The Mạc emperor (Mac Mau Hop) recaptured the city the next year. 20 years later in 1592, Trinh Tung again captured Hanoi and executed Mac Mau Hop.

In 1593, Nguyen Hoang went personally to the court, bringing money and an army to help destroy the remaining Mac armies. Once the Mạc were defeated, Nguyen Hoang held the office of Grand Vizier for the next 7 years. His nephew Trinh Tung became increasingly wary of Nguyen Hoang's influence in the court and kept Hoàng near him at all times for surveillance purposes. Nguyen Hoang adopted Trinh Tung's two generals as his nephews and incited them to rebel against their commander. When the rebels stormed the court, Trinh Tung fled with the Emperor while Hoàng took to the Southern Provinces, never to return. In 1600 the old Nguyen ruler broke relations with the Trinh court and titled himself as the Vuong (a term meaning prince or king). Hoang died in 1613. The new leader of the Nguyen, Nguyen Phuc Nguyen, continued his father's policy of defiance, and also initiated friendly relations with the Europeans sailing into the area. A foreign trading post was set up in Hoi An. By 1615 the Nguyen were producing their own bronze cannons with the aid of Portuguese engineers.

== Trịnh offensive ==
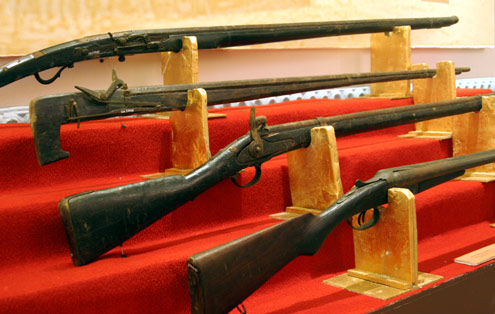
Upper:Goa style arquebuses

In 1633 the Trịnh tried an amphibious assault on the Nguyễn to get around the wall. The Trịnh fleet was defeated by the Nguyễn fleet at the battle of Nhat-Le. Around 1636/1637, the Trịnh copied the Nguyễn and sought military aid from the Europeans. Trịnh Tráng hired the Dutch to make cannons and ships for the Royal army. In 1642–43, the Trịnh army attacked the Nguyễn walls. With the aid of the Dutch cannons, the Trịnh army broke through the first wall but failed to break through the second. At sea, the Trịnh, with their Dutch ships Kievit, Nachtegaels and Woekende Book were destroyed in a defeat by the Nguyễn fleet with their Chinese style galleys. Trịnh Tráng staged yet another offensive in 1648 and at the battle of Truong Duc, the Royal army was beaten by the Nguyễn.

== Nguyễn offensive ==
The Nguyễn launched their own invasion of northern Vietnam in 1653. The Nguyễn army attacked north and defeated the weakened Royal army. Quảng Bình Province was captured. Then Hà Tĩnh Province fell to the Nguyễn army. In the following year, Trịnh Tráng died as Nguyễn forces made attacks into Nghệ An Province. Under a new Trịnh Lord, the capable Trịnh Tạc, the Royal army attacked the Nguyễn army and defeated it. The Nguyễn were weakened by a division between their two top generals who refused to cooperate with each other. In 1656 the Nguyễn army was driven back all the way to their original walls. Trịnh Tạc tried to break the walls of the Nguyễn in 1661 and this attack, like some before it, failed to break through the walls.

== Seventh campaign ==
In 1671, the Trịnh made a last effort to conquer the southern Nguyễn. They gathered an army of 80,000 men, the largest invasion force of the entire conflict. The attacking army was under the command of Trịnh Tạc and his son, Trịnh Căn, while the defending army was under the command of Nguyễn Phúc Tần's son Prince Nguyễn Phúc Thuận and Nguyễn Hữu Dật. The Trinh army crossed the Gianh river, then assaulted on the Xiangkhouang citadel and the Nguyen walls, and was halted by the Nguyen navy. The Trinh army lost 17,000 men within the first three days of the offensive against 25,000 Nguyen troops, which forced them to abort the attack and start peace talks.

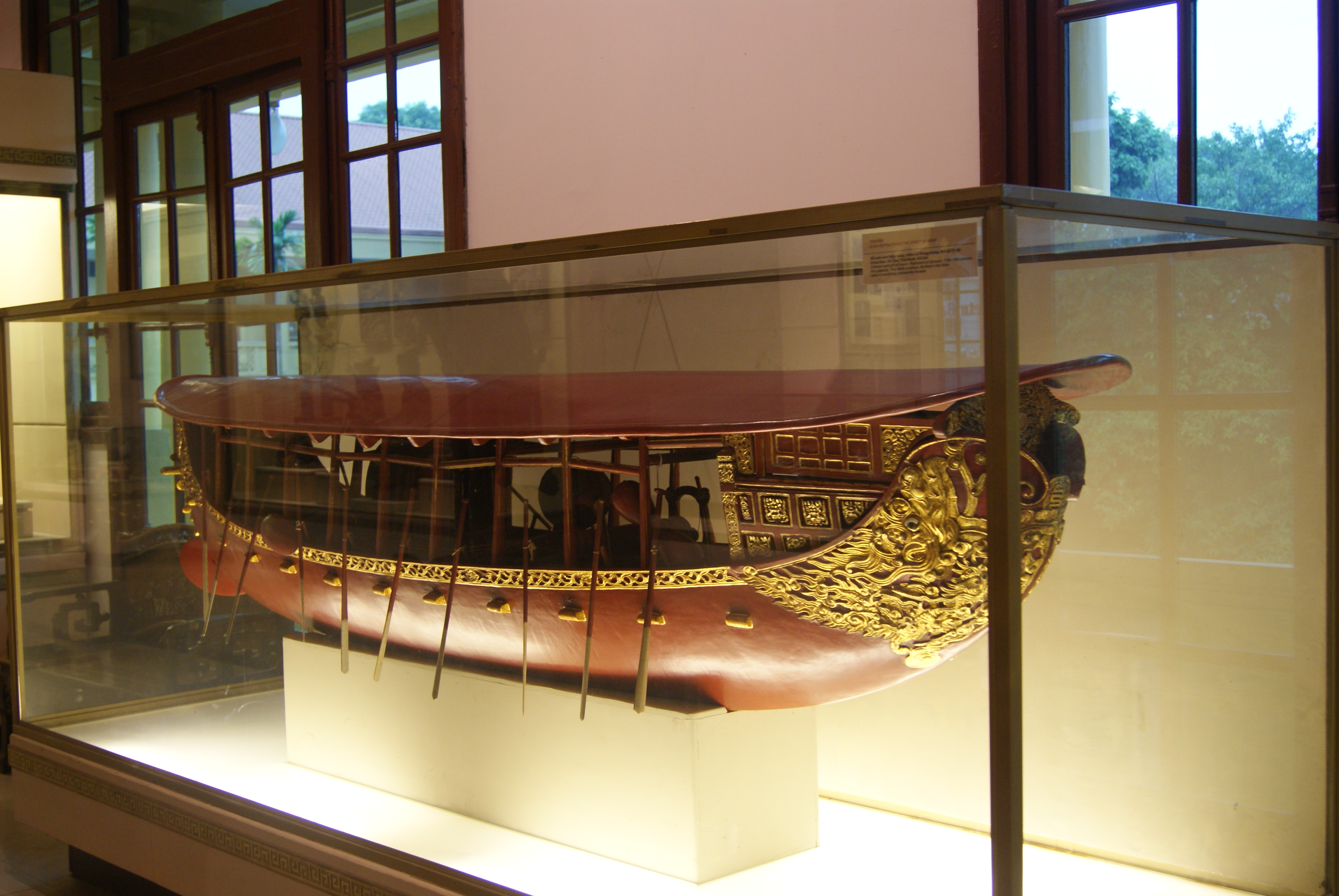
The model of a riverine warship (Mông Đồng) during Trịnh's era in XVII.

== Legacy ==
The Dutch brought Montagnard slaves they captured from Nguyễn lord territories in Quảng Nam Province to their colony in Taiwan.

== See also ==
- Southern and Northern Dynasties of Vietnam
- Northern, Central and Southern Vietnam
- Sino–Dutch conflicts
- Cambodian–Dutch War
- Lê–Mạc War
- Vietnam War
