= Trịnh Cối =

Trịnh Cối 鄭檜
- Trịnh lords Lord of Tonkin
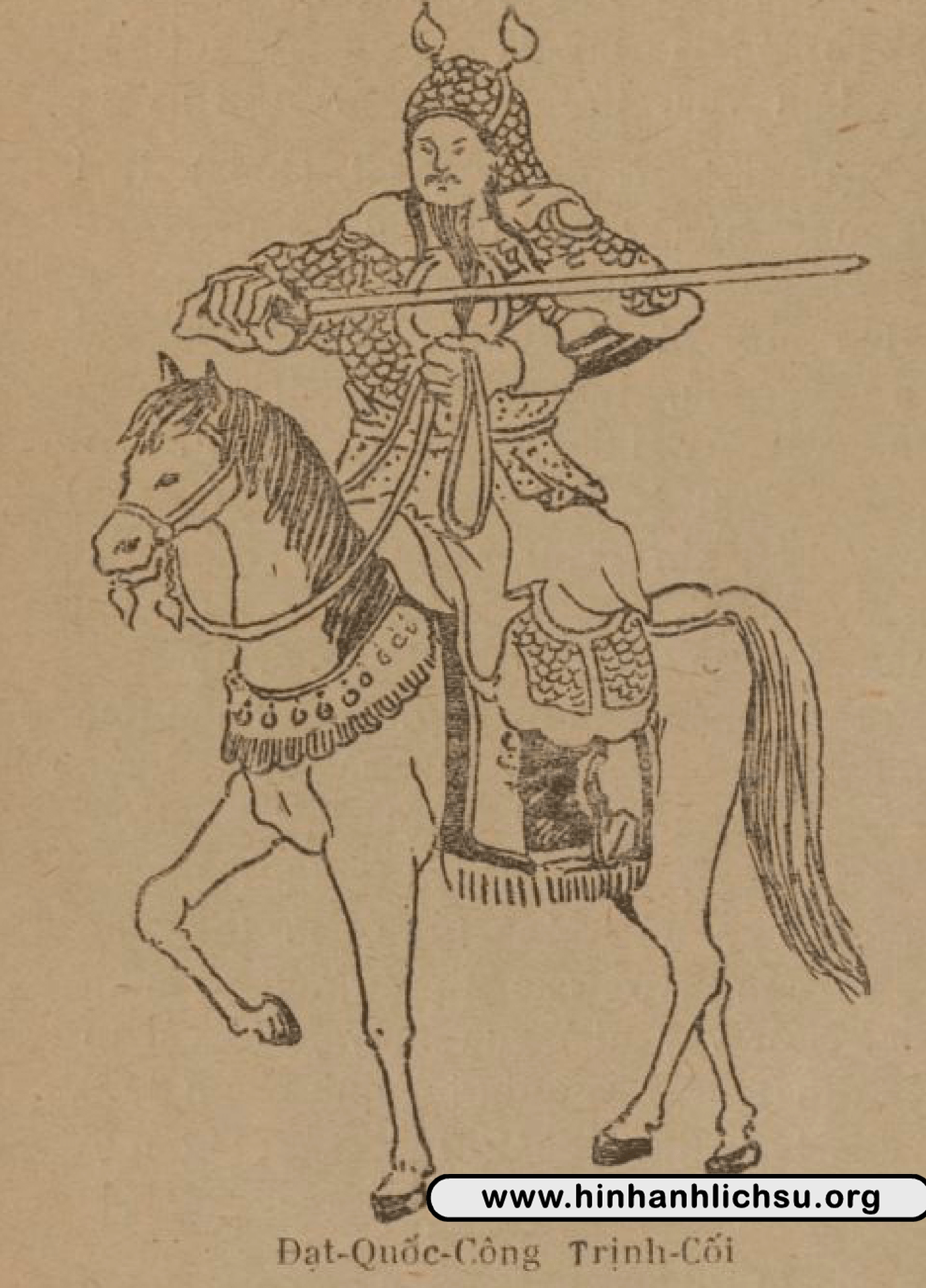
- Portrait painting of lord Trịnh Cối.

Trịnh Lords
- Reign: 1570–1572
- Predecessor: Trịnh Kiểm
- Successor: Trịnh Tùng
- Born: Unknown; Sáo Sơn village, Vĩnh Hùng commune, Vĩnh Lộc district, Thanh Hoa town, Vietnam
- Died: 1584; Đông Kinh, Annam
- Spouse: Lại Thị Ngọc Nho
Names
- Trịnh Cối (鄭檜)
Posthumous name
- Archduke Trung Lương (忠國公)
- House: Trịnh lords
- Father: Trịnh Kiểm
- Mother: Lại Thị Ngọc Vi
- Religion: Buddhism

Trịnh Cối (鄭檜, ?–1584) was the de facto ruler of the Southern dynasty in only 1570 and official ruler during 1570–1572.

== Biography ==
Trịnh Cối was born at Sáo Sơn village, Vĩnh Hùng commune, Vĩnh Lộc district, Thanh Hoa town (now Thanh Hóa province). He was the eldest son of duke Trịnh Kiểm and had a title Marquis Tuấn Đức (俊德侯).

In February 1570, Trịnh Kiểm has died, so emperor Lê Anh Tông gave Trịnh Cối the authority with new title Duke Đạt Nghĩa (義達公). However, some officials and generals didn't comply with Trịnh Cối, so they supported his younger brother Trịnh Tùng. April 1570, officials Lê Cập Đệ, Trịnh Vĩnh Thiệu, Trịnh Bách, Phan Công Tích with their inferiors went to Trịnh Tùng's house and advised him to plot a coup d'état. At first Trịnh Tùng pretended refusing for the suffering, then he agreed completely.

After the Northern dynasty heard the news about a confusion in Thanh Hoa, Emperor Mạc Mục Tông had assigned Prince Mạc Kính Điển to lead 100,000 soldiers with 700 warships to attack Southern dynasty. In August 1570, all of Thanh Hoa produced a stir.

Mạc forces came on waterfronts Linh Tràng, Chi Long, Hội Triều and occupied Bút Cương village easily and quickly. Northern dynasty garrisoned in Hà Trung, both parties faced about 10 miles. So Trịnh Cối was caught between Mạc forces and Trịnh Tùng, and he was reluctant to surrender to Mạc Kính Điển.

Immediately the Mạc forces cancelled marching orders, Trịnh Cối directed his mother, wives, children and inferiors about 1,000 persons to follow marshal Mạc Kính Điển in the backing Đông Kinh. Emperor Mạc Mục Tông had conferred him a title Marquis Trung Lương (中良侯) and his inferiors "duke". All of them had been banished to the capital.

In September 1584, Trịnh Cối died. The Mạc dynasty declared the provisional truce, then consigned Southern dynasty Trịnh Cối's bones for the entombing.

A surrender made Trịnh Cối to be slighted by Lê dynasty's records, Trịnh clan annals haven't even recognize him as the leader of Southern dynasty. He was only recognized by Nguyễn dynasty's records. However, contemporary lord Trịnh Tráng (son of lord Trịnh Tùng) still conferred a posthumous title Archduke Trung Lương (忠國公).

== See also ==
- Trịnh Tùng

Vietnamese royalty
Preceded by Trịnh Kiểm	Trịnh lords Lord of Tonkin; 1570–1572	Succeeded by Trịnh Tùng
