= Cầm Bá Thước =

Tai leader

Cầm Bá Thước was a leader of Thái people in Tonkin, Vietnam. He was born in 1859 in Trịnh Vạn canton, Thường Xuân district, died in 1895 in Thanh Hóa city (killed by the French), Thanh Hóa province. In 1885, in response to the Cần Vương movement, Cầm Bá Thước set up an uprising base in Trịnh Vạn canton, then it has quickly developed into the surrounding areas: associated with Hà Văn Mao in Quan Hóa district (now is Bá Thước district); Lương Văn Tạo in Mường Xay of Sầm Tớ (Houaphanh province); Lang Văn Thiết, Lang Văn Hạnh in Quỳ Châu (Nghệ An province) ...

The ten-year resistance movement of the Thái people in the mountainous area of Thanh Hóa led by Cầm Bá Thước inflicted significant casualties on the French forces, and provided key lessons about mobilizing the masses, organized forces, build bases.
