= 成祖 =

成祖 may refer to several Chinese and Vietnamese monarchs.

- Chengzu (1360–1424, reigned 1402–1424), Chinese monarch of the Ming dynasty
- Thành Tổ (1560–1623, reigned 1572–1623), Vietnamese monarch of Đại Việt
