= Pu Luong =

Pù Luông Xã Pù Luông
- Commune
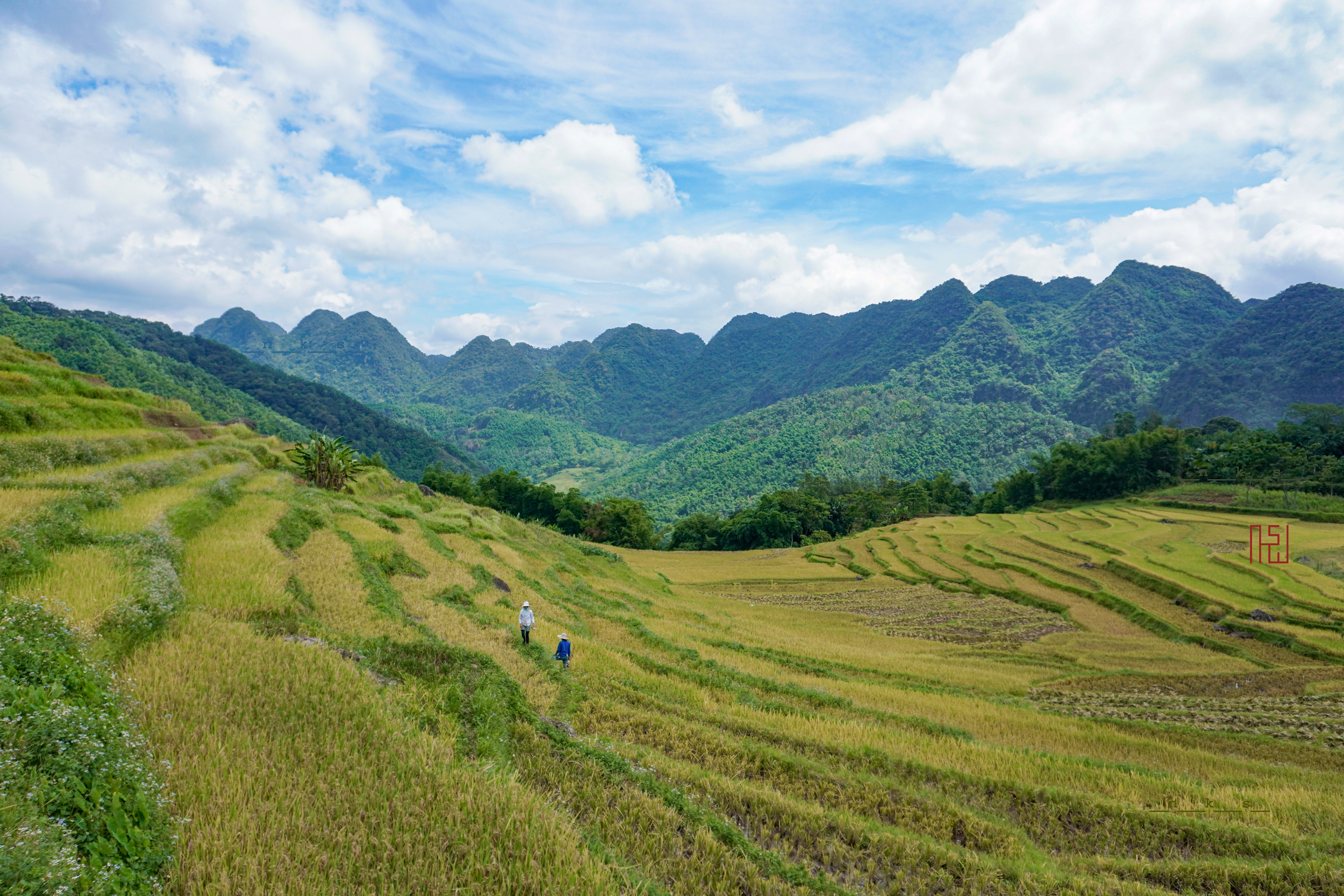
- Terraced fields in Pù Luông
- Interactive map of Pù Luông
- Coordinates: 20°27′02″N 105°10′01″E
- Country: Vietnam
- Region: North Central Coast
- Province: Thanh Hóa
- Established: 16 June 2025
- Seat: Đồng Hamlet

Area
  - Total: 81.71 km^{2} (31.55 sq mi)

Population (2024)
  - Total: 9,573
  - Density: 117/km^{2} (300/sq mi)
- Website: puluong.thanhhoa.gov.vn

Pù Luông is a commune of Thanh Hóa province, Vietnam.

The commune was established on 16 June 2025 on the basis of merging the former communes of Thành Sơn, Lũng Niêm, and Thành Lâm of the former Bá Thước district. Pù Luông officially came into operation on 1 July 2025.

== Geography ==
Pù Luông is located in the mountainous northwestern part of Thanh Hóa province. It borders:

- To the east and north: Cổ Lũng
- To the northwest: Phú Lệ and Phú Xuân
- To the west and south: Hồi Xuân
- To the southeast: Bá Thước

The commune covers an area of 81.71 km^{2} and had a population of 9,573 in 2024, with a population density of 117 inhabitants per km^{2}.

== History ==
Before its establishment, the present-day territory of Pù Luông comprised the communes of Thành Sơn, Lũng Niêm, and Thành Lâm, located in the northwestern area of Bá Thước district.

On 16 June 2025, Bá Thước district was dissolved due to the nationwide administrative reorganization of 2025. Pù Luông commune was created under Resolution No. 1686/NQ-UBTVQH15 of the Standing Committee of the National Assembly, based on the full natural area and population of the former communes Thành Sơn, Lũng Niêm, and Thành Lâm. The commune formally came into operation on 1 July 2025 as an administrative unit under Thanh Hóa province.

== Administration ==
Pù Luông commune consists of 20 residential self-governing units. Below is the list of these units according to the administrative boundaries of the former communes:

Code	Former commune	Administrative units	
Code	Former commune	Quantity	List
14938	Thành Sơn	5 hamlets, 1 village	Báng, Eo Kén, Kho Mường, Nông Công, Pà Ban; Pù Luông Village
14956	Lũng Niêm	7 hamlets, 1 street	Bồng, Đòn, Đồng, Đủ, Lặn Ngoài, Lặn Trong, Niêm Thành; Đoàn Street
14968	Thành Lâm	6 hamlets	Bầm, Cốc, Đanh, Đôn, Leo, Tân Thành
