= Lê Thế Tông =

Lê Thế Tông 黎世宗
- Emperor of Đại Việt

Emperor of the Revival Lê dynasty
- Reign: 1573–1599
- Predecessor: Lê Anh Tông
- Successor: Lê Kính Tông
- Regent: Trịnh Tùng
- Born: November 1567
- Died: 24 August 1599 (aged 31–32)
Names
- Lê Duy Đàm (黎維潭)
Era name and dates
- Gia Thái (嘉泰): 1573–1577; Quang Hưng (光興): 1578–1599
Posthumous name
- Tích Thuần Cương Chính Dũng Quả Nghị Hoàng đế (積純剛正勇果毅皇帝)
Temple name
- Thế Tông (世宗)
- House: Lê dynasty
- Father: Lê Anh Tông

Lê Thế Tông (chữ Hán: 黎世宗, November 1567 – 24 August 1599, reigned January 1573 – 24 August 1599), real name Lê Duy Đàm (黎維潭) was the 15th emperor of the later Lê dynasty of Vietnam.

He was the fifth son of Lê Anh Tông, born during the Trịnh–Nguyễn war. In 1573, Anh Tông saw that Trịnh Tùng was autocratic, so he and four great princes left the palace of Vạn Lại and fled to Nghệ An. On the first day of the new year 1573, Trịnh Tùng established a 5-year-old Lê Duy Đàm to become emperor; three weeks later Trịnh Tùng sent Tống Đức Vị to secretly kill Anh Tông. During the reign of Thế Tông, Trịnh Tùng took full control of the military and continued to wage war with the Mạc in Đông Kinh. After many great campaigns, in 1592 Trịnh Tùng defeated the Mạc army, regained Đông Kinh and brought Thế Tông back to the old capital. Therefore, the national history of Đại Việt was compiled by Trịnh lords and considered Lê Thế Tông to be the king who was instrumental in restoring the inheritance of the Later Le dynasty.

In fact, although the Lê dynasty was re-established, the real power fell into Trịnh Tùng's hands, leaving the king with only vanity. In 1599, Thế Tông appointed Trịnh Tùng as King of Bình An (Bình An Vương), beginning a period known as the reign of Lê kings - Trịnh lords (Vua Lê - Chúa Trịnh). In 1599, Thế Tông died, reigned for 26 years, aged 33 years, and was buried at Hua Yueling (華岳陵). After his death, his fourth son, Lê Duy Tân, was enthroned by Trịnh Tùng as King Lê Kính Tông.

== Family ==
- Issues: Lê Duy Trì (黎维持), Lê Duy Tân (黎维新)

Preceded by Lê Anh Tông	Emperor of Vietnam; 1573–1599	Succeeded by Lê Kính Tông
