= Anh Tông =

- Vietnamese alphabet: Anh Tông
- Chữ Hán: 英宗
- Literal meaning: Heroic Ancestor

Anh Tông is the temple name for several emperors of Vietnam, derived from the Chinese equivalent Yīngzōng. It may refer to:

- Lý Anh Tông (1136–1175, reigned 1138–1175), emperor of the Lý dynasty
- Trần Anh Tông (1276–1320, reigned 1293–1314), emperor of the Trần dynasty
- Lê Anh Tông (1532–1573, reigned 1556–1573), emperor of the Lê dynasty

== See also ==
- Yingzong (disambiguation), Chinese equivalent
