= Yingzong =

- Chinese: 英宗
- Literal meaning: Heroic Ancestor
Transcriptions
Standard Mandarin
- Hanyu Pinyin: Yīngzōng
- Wade–Giles: Ying^{1}-tsung^{1}

Yingzong is the temple name of several emperors of China. It may refer to:

- Emperor Yingzong of Song (1032–1067, reigned 1063–1067), emperor of the Song dynasty
- Gegeen Khan (1302–1323, reigned 1320–1323), Emperor Yingzong of the Yuan dynasty
- Emperor Yingzong of Ming (1427–1464, reigned 1435–1449 and 1457–1464), emperor of the Ming dynasty

== See also ==
- Anh Tông (disambiguation), Vietnamese equivalent
