= Trịnh Tùng =

Trịnh lord (1550–1623)

Trịnh Tùng 鄭松
- Trịnh lords Lord of Đàng Ngoài
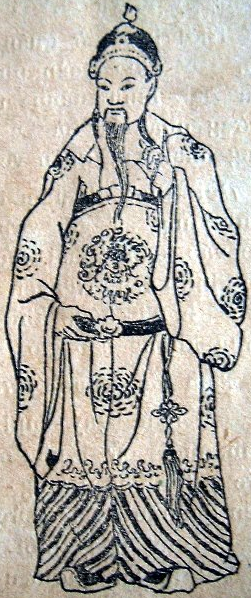

Trịnh lords
- Reign: 1572–1623
- Predecessor: Trịnh Cối
- Successor: Trịnh Tráng
- Born: 19 December 1550; Thanh Hóa, Đại Việt
- Died: 17 July 1623 (aged 72); Thanh Oai District, Đàng Ngoài
- Spouse: Lại Thị Ngọc Nhu; Đặng Thị Ngọc Bảo
- Issue: Trịnh Tráng; Trịnh Túc more than 20 sons and daughters
Names
- Trịnh Tùng (鄭松)
Regnal name
- Bình An Vương (平安王)
Posthumous name
- Triết Vương (哲王)
Temple name
- Thành Tổ (成祖)
- House: Trịnh lord
- Father: Trịnh Kiểm
- Mother: Nguyễn Thị Ngọc Bảo
- Religion: Buddhism

Trịnh Tùng (19 December 1550 – 17 July 1623), also known as Trịnh Tòng and later given the title Bình An Vương (平安王), was the de facto ruler of Đại Việt from 1572 to 1623. Trịnh Tùng is the first official Trịnh lord, although his father—Trịnh Kiểm—was de facto ruler of Dai Viet before him, Trịnh Kiểm never claimed himself as Trịnh lord. Therefore, Trịnh Kiểm is not considered as the first Trịnh lord.

Trịnh Tùng was reputed to be from the first generation of the Trịnh lords who ruled Vietnam from 1545 to 1789; however, since he was so young when the family first came to power, Trịnh Tùng theoretically belonged to the second generation. The Trịnh family wielded the military power of the country and took turns as regents to the figurehead Lê kings who nominally reigned over the country. Trịnh Kiểm, Tùng's father, was given the title of 'Duke' during his life and after his death was conferred with the title of Thái Vương, which means "Great Prince". From the time of Trịnh Tùng onwards, members of the Trịnh family were given the title of Prince while in power. Also known with the title of Lord, they had the right to choose the crown prince and had power over political and military matters. During his rule, the war with the Mạc dynasty was successfully completed.

== History ==
Trịnh Tùng was the second son of Trịnh Kiểm. In 1572, upon the death of his father, Trịnh Tùng's elder brother, Trịnh Cối, took command. Immediately challenged by Trịnh Tùng, Trịnh Cối lost a battle to the Mạc, and thus Trịnh Tùng took control of the situation. He proved to be a very capable leader and in 1571, the Lê Loyalist Army captured the Eastern capital Thăng Long from emperor Mạc Mậu Hợp. However, a counteroffensive the next year drove them out. In the midst of this reversal, the nominal Lê emperor, Lê Anh Tông, fled to Nghệ An Province. Trịnh Tùng appointed a new emperor (Lê Thế Tông), and had the previous king assassinated. The war against the Mạc continued for the next twenty years until 1592, when the Eastern Capital (Dong kinh) was reconquered. Mạc Mậu Hợp was captured during the retreat and subsequently executed.

Further military actions took place against the army of the Mạc in the years 1593 and 1594. The Royal (Trịnh) army was lent assistance in this battle by Tung's uncle Nguyễn army.

In formal recognition for his defeat of the Mạc, Trịnh Tùng was given the title Pacifying Prince (Bình An Vương) in 1599.

In 1619, Emperor Lê Kinh Tông, and Tùng's own son, Trịnh Xuân schemed against Trịnh Tùng so the emperor could reclaim actual Imperial power but the plot was discovered, the emperor was forced to garrotte himself and a new emperor was put in his place (Lê Thần Tông). This led Nguyễn Phúc Nguyên to a formal ending of his relations with the court which, after seven more years, led to the Trịnh–Nguyễn War.

By 1623, Trịnh Tùng was growing old. He tried to secure his succession by dividing rule between his two sons in order to avoid conflict. His attempt was not successful.

"Jealousy broke out in his family even before his death, as not only both his sons but also one of his brothers tried to (take) his power. Trịnh Tùng was taken ill to his brother's house and there his younger son was murdered. The elder, called Trịnh Tráng, hearing of this, ran away to the province of Thanh Hóa, taking with him the king and the royal family. Trịnh Tùng was then driven away from his brother's place, and, abandoned by the servants who had carried him away in a sedan chair, died alone on the road. So ended the life of a statesman who had more capacity and energy than any other man mentioned in the whole of Annamese history..."

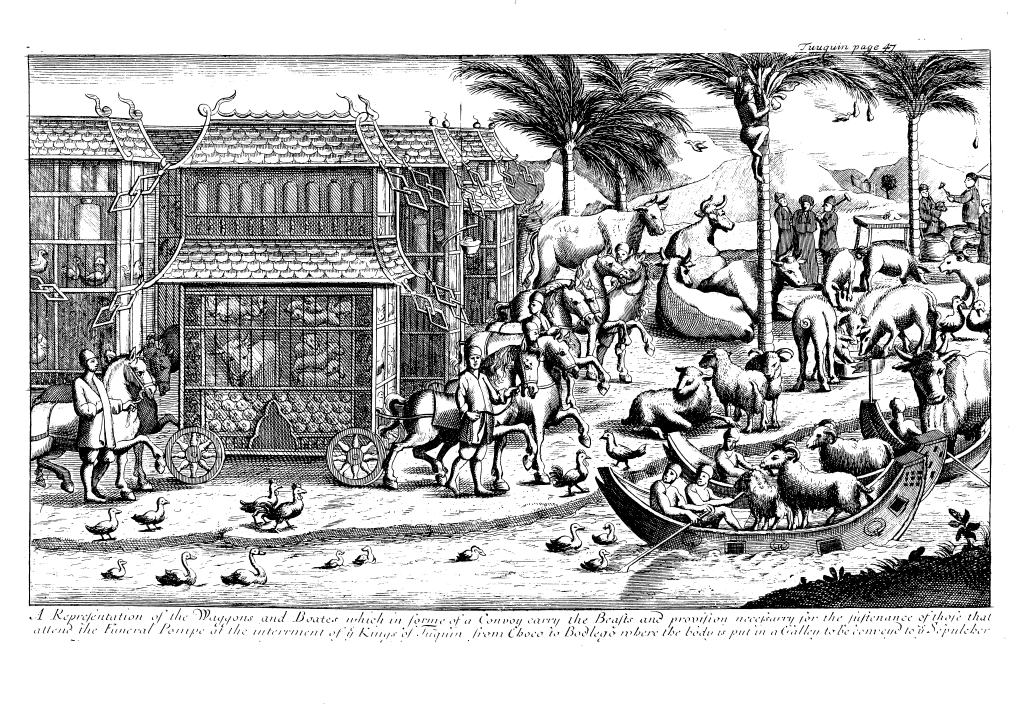
Funeral of Lord Trinh Tung painted by Western merchants

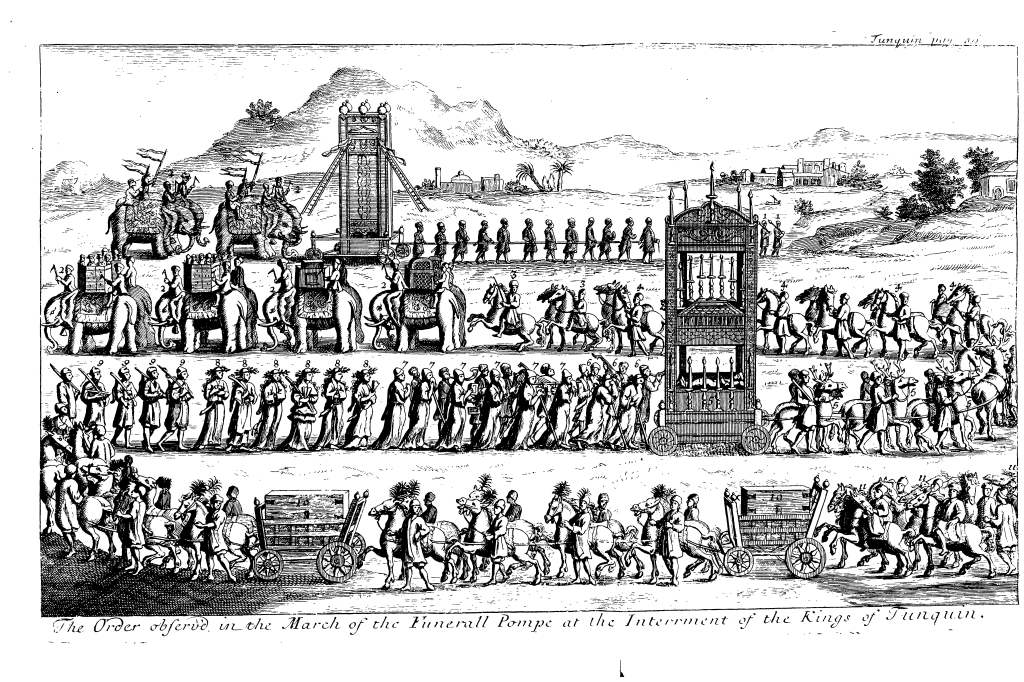
Funeral of Lord Trinh Tung painted by Western merchants

== Sources ==
- A Glimpse of Vietnam's History (retrieved May 2006)

== See also ==
- Cao Cao
- Lê dynasty
- List of Vietnamese dynasties

Vietnamese royalty
Preceded by Trịnh Cối	Trịnh lords Lord of Đàng Ngoài; 1572–1623	Succeeded by Trịnh Trang
