= Vietnamese civil war =

Vietnamese civil war may refer to:

- Anarchy of the 12 Warlords (965–968)
- Civil War of Dai Viet during the Tran Dynasty (1285; 1287–1288) between the Trần Ích Tắc's court and Trần dynasty
- Lê–Mạc War (1533–1677)
- Trịnh–Nguyễn War (1627–1672; 1774–1775)
- Tây Sơn Wars:
  - Tây Sơn–Nguyễn War (1773–1785; 1792–1802)
  - Tây Sơn–Trịnh War (1785–1788)
  - Tay Son–Le War (1788–1789) between the Le Chieu Thong's court (Lê dynasty) and Tây Sơn dynasty
- Civil conflicts in Vietnam (1945–1949)
- First Indochina War (later stage, 1950–1954) between the Vietnamese National Army and the People's Army of Vietnam
- Vietnam War (1955–1975) between the Republic of Vietnam Military Forces and People's Army of Vietnam/Viet Cong
