= Zhongzong =

Zhongzong (Chinese: 中宗; Wade–Giles: Chung-tsung) is the temple name of several Chinese emperors. It may refer to:

- Emperor Xuan of Han (r. 74–49 BC)
- Emperor Yuan of Jin (r. 317–322)
- Li Shou, ruler of Cheng Han (r. 338–343)
- Murong Sheng, ruler of Later Liang (r. 398–401)
- Emperor Wen of Liu Song, (r. 424–453)
- Emperor Xuan of Western Liang (r. 555–562)
- Emperor Zhongzong of Tang (r. 684 and 705–710)
- Liu Sheng (Southern Han) (r. 943–958), Emperor Zhongzong of Southern Han
- Duan Zhengchun, Zhongzong of Dali (r. 1096–1108)

== See also ==
- Zhongzong Township (木尔宗乡), in Barkam, Sichuan, China
- Jungjong (Korean romanization of 中宗)
- Lê Trung Tông (disambiguation)
