= Lê Trang Tông =

Lê Trang Tông 黎莊宗
- Emperor of Đại Việt

Emperor of the Revival Lê dynasty
- Reign: 1533–1548
- Predecessor: Lê Cung Hoàng (of Lê dynasty); Mạc Thái Tổ (of Mạc dynasty)
- Successor: Lê Trung Tông
- Regent: Nguyễn Kim (1533–1545); Trịnh Kiểm (1545–1548)
- Born: 1515; Đông Kinh, An Nam
- Died: 9 March 1548 (aged 33–34); Thanh Hoa garrison, An Nam
- Burial: Cảnh Tomb (景陵)
- Spouse: Trịnh Thị Ngọc Cửu
Names
- Lê Ninh (黎寧)
Era name and dates
- Nguyên Hòa (元和): 1533–1548
Posthumous name
- Dụ hoàng đế (裕皇帝)
Temple name
- Trang Tông (莊宗)
- House: Revival Lê Dynasty
- Father: Unknown
- Mother: Phạm Thị Ngọc Quỳnh

Lê Trang Tông (黎莊宗, 1515 – 9 March 1548) was the 12th emperor of the Later Lê dynasty and the first from the Revival Lê dynasty. His enthronement marked the return of the Later Lê dynasty after six years of war.

== Biography ==
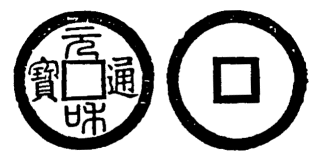
Coins issued by Lê Ninh in 1533.

Lê Trang Tông was born in 1515 at Đông Kinh; his real name was Lê Ninh (黎寧). In 1527 general Mạc Đăng Dung overthrew the Lê dynasty and established the Mạc dynasty. Lê Ninh and the rest of his family fled to Trấn Ninh and later hid deep inside Laos for 6 years. In 1533, Lê loyalist Nguyễn Kim rebelled against the Mạc dynasty. He sent troops to Laos to recover the exiled royal family and proclaimed Lê Ninh as emperor with the reign name Nguyên Hòa (元和), establishing a temporary capital at the city of Tây Kinh. Thus began a period of warfare in the country that would last until 1592. In 1548, the emperor fell fatally ill and died. He was succeeded by his son Lê Huyên, but from this point onwards power was held not by the emperors but by the Trịnh and Nguyễn families.

Preceded by Lê Cung Hoàng	Emperor of Vietnam; 1533–1548	Succeeded by Lê Trung Tông
