= Nguyễn Kim =

Vietnamese statesman

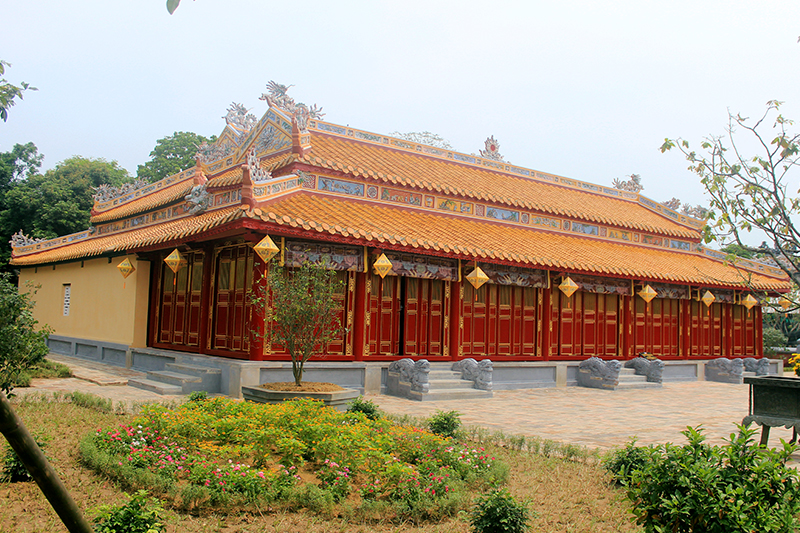
- Temple of Nguyễn Kim in Huế
- Born: Nguyễn Kim; 1468; Thanh Hóa
- Died: 1545 (aged 76–77); Nghệ An

- Nguyễn Kim
- Vietnamese alphabet: Nguyễn Kim
- Chữ Hán: 阮淦

- Posthumous name
- Vietnamese alphabet: Tĩnh Vương
- Chữ Hán: 靖王

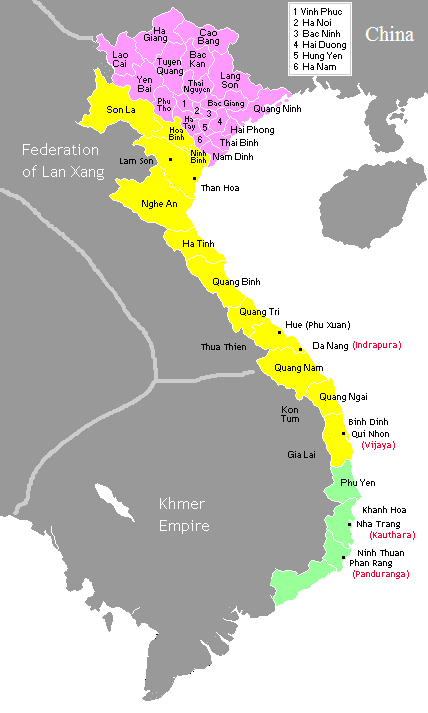
Map of Vietnam showing the Mạc in control of the north and central part of Vietnam while the Nguyễn-Trịnh alliance controls the south.

Nguyen Kim (Vietnamese: Nguyễn Kim / 阮淦; 1468–1545) was a Vietnamese statesman who was the ancestor of the famous Nguyễn Lords who later ruled south Vietnam (and much later, all of Vietnam). During his rule, the war with the Mạc dynasty started.

Nguyễn Kim claimed descent from Nguyễn Trãi, one of the top aides of Lê Lợi. He was the son of Nguyễn Hoang Du, one of the leaders of the first revolt against Mạc Đăng Dung). After the first revolt was crushed and his father executed, a second revolt against Mạc Đăng Dung took place in response to Dung's usurpation of the throne in 1527. This second revolt was led by Nguyễn Kim and his son-in-law, Trịnh Kiểm.

== Career ==
In 1527, a high-rank military officer of the weakened court, Mạc Đăng Dung, seized power of Đại Việt. He deposed the ruling Lê monarch, Lê Cung Hoàng and made himself ruler of Đại Việt. In 1529, Nguyễn Kim who was a loyalist of the old royal family, went to Laos and submitted to the Laotian king Photisarath (r. 1520 – 1547). Photisarath granted for Nguyễn Kim administrator the territory of Xam Neua. In Đại Việt, Mạc Đăng Dung suppressed the Lê loyalist in Thanh Hóa, forced the Lê remnant to seek refuge in Nguyễn Kim's domain. In 1533, Nguyễn Kim proclaimed prince Lê Ninh (son of emperor Lê Chiêu Tông) as king of Đại Việt. Photisarath acknowledged this claim and allocated resources to support it. Envoys were sent to Ming China in 1536 and 1537 to denounce Mạc Đăng Dung as a usurper and to request an intervention aid in restoring the legitimate dynasty.

However the Ming canceled their intervention. The struggle continued as with aided by members of two powerful Thanh Hóa military clans, the Nguyễn and Trịnh, the Lê family slowly made their way back to power. This effort continued through most of the sixteenth century, and in the course of the long seesaw struggle with the Mạc, a rivalry emerged between the two families, represented by their principal figures, Nguyễn Kim and Trịnh Kiểm (1503–1570). This tension developed even though the families were not merely allied militarily, but were also linked through marriage. Nguyễn Kim had married one of his daughters to Trịnh Kiểm, thus binding the two families in a time-honored fashion. Neither the military nor the marital connections, however, could forestall Trịnh Kiểm's personal ambitions. The ongoing contest for political supremacy gradually saw the Trịnh gain the upper hand, a position that was secured when the Nguyễn paterfamilias was murdered at the hands of a surrendering Mạc general in 1545. Eager to eliminate his rivals, Trịnh Kiểm arranged to have the elder Nguyễn son killed. His youngest son, Nguyễn Hoàng, saw in this act his own fate unless he took measures to protect himself. Through his sister, Kiểm's wife, Hoàng requested that he be appointed governor general of the distant southern frontier territories of Thuận Hoá and Quảng Nam. Remote exile of this political challenger suited the Trịnh overlord, and he agreed to the request. Shortly thereafter, in 1558, Nguyễn Hoàng entered the southern realms, marking the beginnings of a political division that would have lasted for 250 years.

== Bibliography ==
- Whitmore, John K. (2016), "The Emergence of the state of Vietnam", in Peterson, Willard J. (ed.), The Cambridge History of China: Volume 9, The Ch'ing Dynasty to 1800, Part 2, Cambridge: Cambridge University Press, pp. 197–233, ISBN 9781316445044
- Dutton, George Edson (2006). The Tây Sơn uprising: society and rebellion in eighteenth-century Vietnam. University of Hawaii Press. ISBN 0-8248-2984-0.
- Taylor, Keith W. (2013). A History of the Vietnamese. Cambridge University Press. ISBN 978-1-107-24435-1.
- Lieberman, Victor B. (2003). Strange Parallels: Southeast Asia in Global Context, c. 800–1830, volume 1, Integration on the Mainland. Cambridge University Press. ISBN 978-0-521-80496-7.
- Encyclopedia of Asian History, Volume 3 (Nguyễn Lords) 1988. Charles Scribner's Sons, New York.
- Annam and its Minor Currency Chapter 16 (downloaded May 2006)

Preceded by Mạc Đăng Dung	Ruler of Vietnam; 1533–1545	Succeeded by Trịnh Kiểm

== See also ==
- Lê dynasty
- List of Vietnamese dynasties
