= Lê Trung Tông =

Lê Trung Tông (Chinese: 黎中宗) may refer to:

- Lê Trung Tông (Early Lê dynasty) (r. 1005)
- Lê Trung Tông (Revival Lê dynasty) (r. 1548 - 1556)
