= Lê Trung Tông (Revival Lê dynasty) =

Lê Trung Tông 黎中宗
- Emperor of Đại Việt

Emperor of Revival Lê dynasty
- Reign: 1548–1556
- Predecessor: Lê Trang Tông
- Successor: Lê Anh Tông
- Regent: Trịnh Kiểm
- Born: 1535
- Died: 24 January 1556 (aged 20-21)
- Burial: Diên Lăng (延陵)
Names
- Lê Huyên (黎暄)
Era name and dates
- Thuận Bình (順平): 1548–1556
Posthumous name
- Vũ Hoàng đế (武皇帝)
Temple name
- Trung Tông (中宗)
- House: Revival Lê dynasty
- Father: Lê Trang Tông

Lê Trung Tông (chữ Hán: 黎中宗, 1535 – 24 January 1556), birth name Lê Huyên (黎暄), posthumously known as Vũ Hoàng đế, was the 13th emperor of the Later Lê Dynasty, reigned from 1548 to 1556. He succeeded Lê Trang Tông (1533–1548) and was succeeded by Lê Anh Tông (1556–1573). The emperor ruled in name only however, as the Trịnh lords monopolized the royal court while the Mạc dynasty ruled in the far north and the Nguyễn lords seized control of the southern part of Vietnam up to Thanh Hoa.

== Sources ==
- Đại Việt Thông Sử, Lê Quý Đôn (1759)

Preceded by Lê Trang Tông	Emperor of Vietnam; 1548–1556	Succeeded by Lê Anh Tông
