= Northern and Southern dynasties (Vietnam) =

Vietnamese dynasties

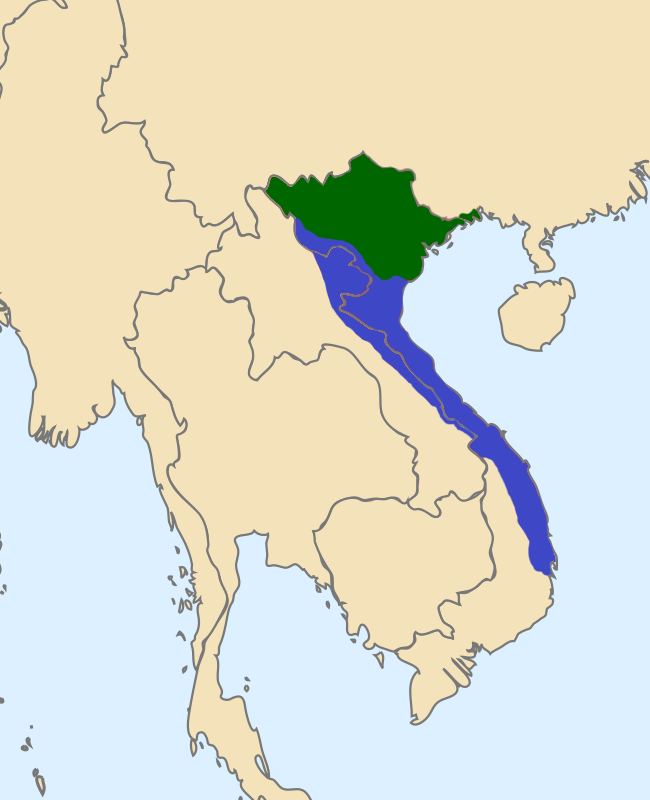
Map of the Northern and Southern dynasties circa 1570 showing the Mac in control of the Red River Delta to the north, and the Nguyễn - Trịnh alliance in control of the Thanh-Nghệ-Thuận-Quảng to the south

The Northern and Southern dynasties (Vietnamese: Nam-Bắc triều; Chữ Hán: 南北朝) in the history of Vietnam, spanning from 1533 to 1592, was a political period in the 16th century during which the Mạc dynasty (Northern dynasty), established by Mạc Đăng Dung in Thăng Long, and the Revival Lê dynasty (Southern dynasty) based in Tây Kinh were in contention. For most of the period, these two dynasties fought a lengthy war known as the Lê–Mạc War.

Initially, the domain of the Southern court was confined within Thanh Hoa province. After the expedition of Nguyễn Hoàng to reclaim Lê territory in the South from Mạc garrison force, Northern dynasty only controlled the provinces from Thanh Hoa up North. Both dynasties claimed to be the sole legitimate dynasty of Vietnam. The nobles and their clansmen switched side frequently to the extent that loyal retainers such as Prince Mạc Kính Điển were praised even by their foes as rare virtuous men. As lords without land, these nobles and their armies behaved a little or no better than petty thieves, raiding and looting the farmers to feed themselves. This state of chaos brought along the destruction of the countryside and reduced many formerly prosperous cities such as Thăng Long to poverty.

The two dynasties fought for nearly sixty years, ended in 1592 when the Southern dynasty defeated the North and recaptured Đông Kinh. However, Mac family members had maintained an autonomous rule in Cao Bằng under the protectorate of Chinese dynasties until 1677.

== Mạc Đăng Dung usurps the throne ==
In the early 16th century, the Later Lê dynasty started weakening. The degenerated Lê dynasty, which endured under six rulers between 1497 and 1527, in the end was no longer able to maintain control over the northern part of the country, much less the new territories to the south. The weakening of the monarchy created a vacuum that the various noble families of the aristocracy were eager to fill. Soon after Lê Chiêu Tông fled south with the Trịnh and the Nguyễn in 1522, Mạc Đăng Dung proclaimed the emperor's younger brother, Le Xuan, as the new emperor under the name Lê Cung Hoàng. In reality, the new emperor had no power. Three years after Mạc's forces killed his older brother, Lê Chiêu Tông, Mạc Đăng Dung ended the fiction that Lê Cung Hoàng actually ruled by killing him in 1527. Mạc Đăng Dung, being a scholar-official who had effectively controlled the Le for a decade, then proclaimed himself the new emperor of Vietnam in 1527, and established the Mac dynasty.

== See also ==
- Lê–Mạc War
- Trịnh–Nguyễn War
- List of Vietnamese dynasties

== Sources ==
- Tran Trong Kim (2005). Việt Nam sử lược (A Brief History of Vietnam) (in Vietnamese). Ho Chi Minh City: Ho Chi Minh City General Publishing House. pp. 260–273.
- Chapuis, Oscar (1995). A History of Vietnam: From Hong Bang to Tu Duc. Greenwood Publishing Group. pp. 113–119. ISBN 0-313-29622-7.
- Taylor, K. W. (2013). A History of the Vietnamese. Cambridge University Press. ISBN 978-0521875868.
