= Mã River =

River in Laos and Vietnam

Coordinates: 19°47′N 105°56′E

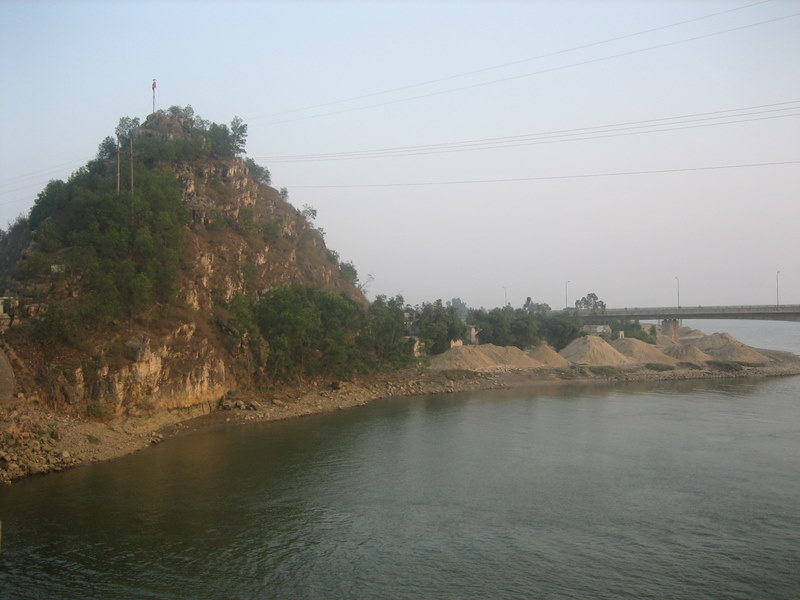
Mã River in Thanh Hóa city, Vietnam

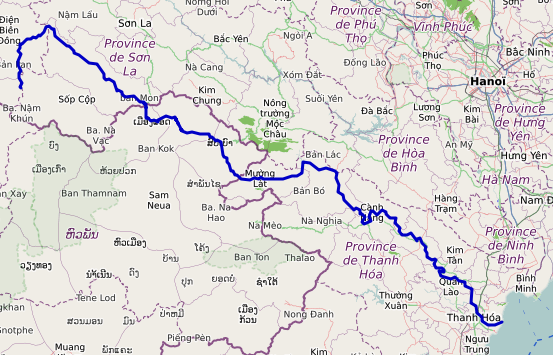
Mã River

The Mã River (Vietnamese: Sông Mã, Lao: ນ້ຳມ້າ / Nam Ma) is a river in Asia, originating in northwestern Vietnam. It flows 400km through Vietnam, Laos, and then back through Vietnam, meeting the sea at the Gulf of Tonkin.

The largest tributaries of the Ma River are the Chu River (also called Nam Sam River in Laos), the Bưởi River, and the Cầu Chày River. All of them join the Ma River in Thanh Hóa Province in North Central Vietnam.

The Mã River creates the Mã River Delta (also called the Thanh Hóa Delta), the third largest in Vietnam.

The Mã River Delta used to be near Vietnam's southern frontier. It was the center of Cửu Chân, the southern of the Vietnam's two prefectures under the rule of the Nanyue in the 2nd century BC.
