= Bá Thước district =

Coordinates: 20.333°N 105.250°E

Bá Thước district Huyện Bá Thước
- District
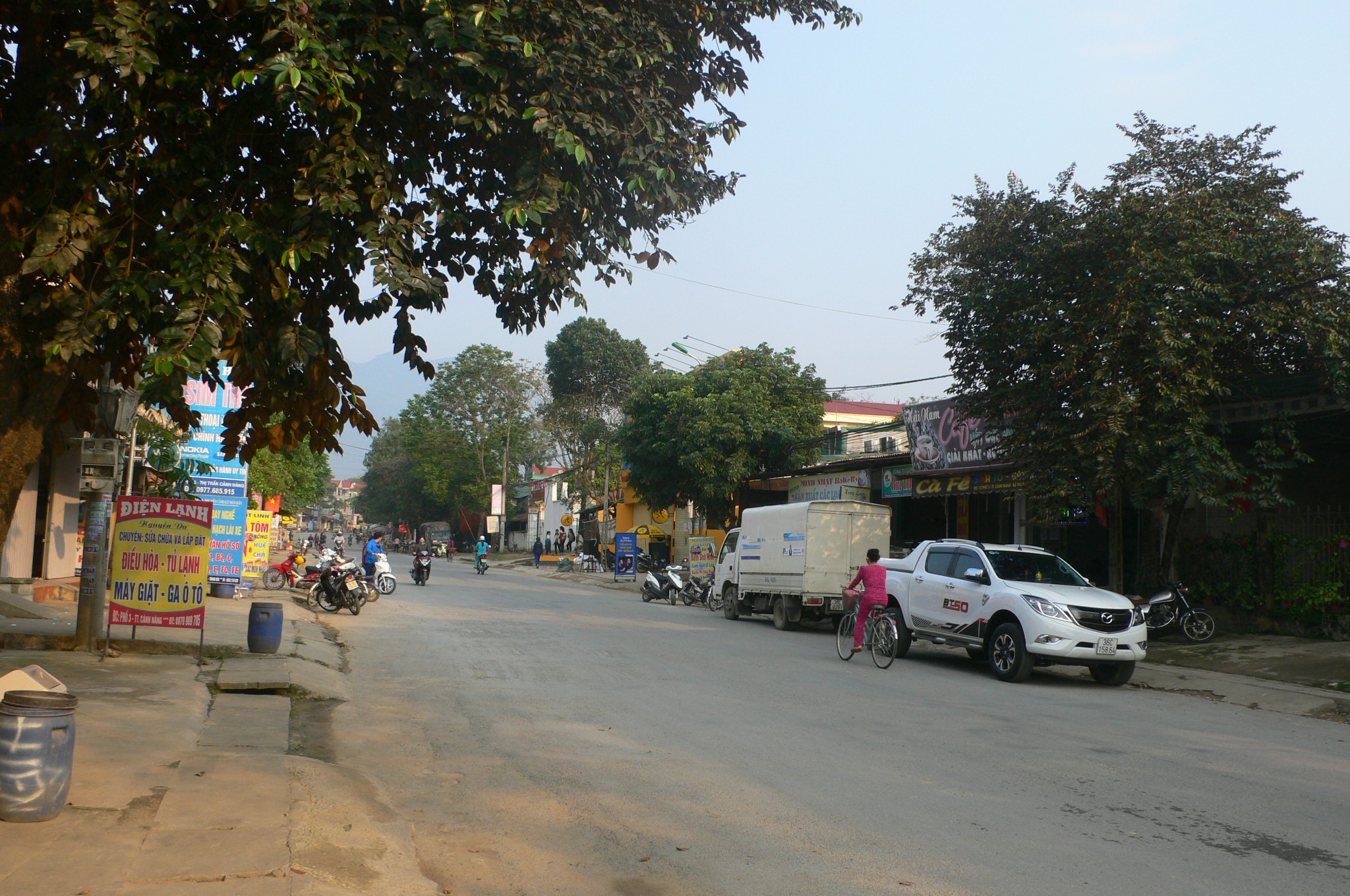
- Canh Nang town
- Interactive map of Bá Thước district
- Country: Vietnam
- Region: North Central Coast
- Province: Thanh Hóa province
- Capital: Cành Nàng

Area
  - Total: 300 sq mi (777 km^{2})

Population (2018)
  - Total: 105,000
- Time zone: UTC+7 (UTC + 7)

Bá Thước is a former district (huyện) of Thanh Hóa province in the North Central Coast region of Vietnam.

As of 2003 the district had a population of 101,323. The district covers an area of 777 km^{2} (300 sq mi). The district capital lies at Cành Nàng.
