= Thanh Hóa (city) =

- Provincial city (Class-1)
- Thanh Hóa City; Thành phố Thanh Hóa
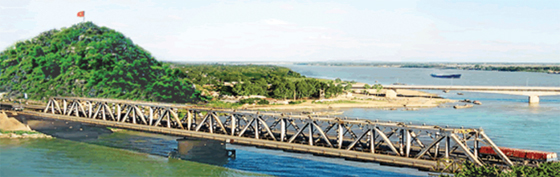
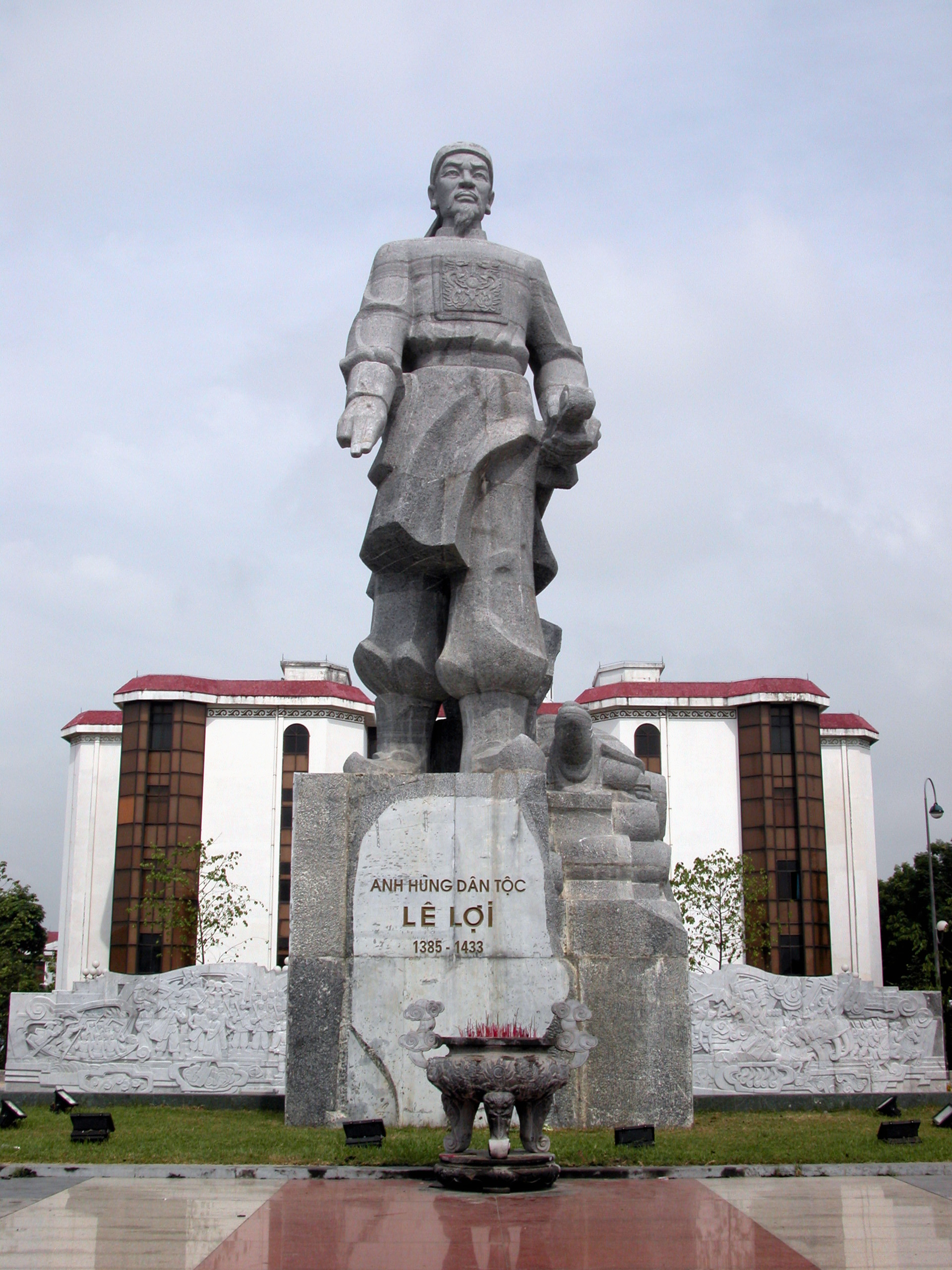
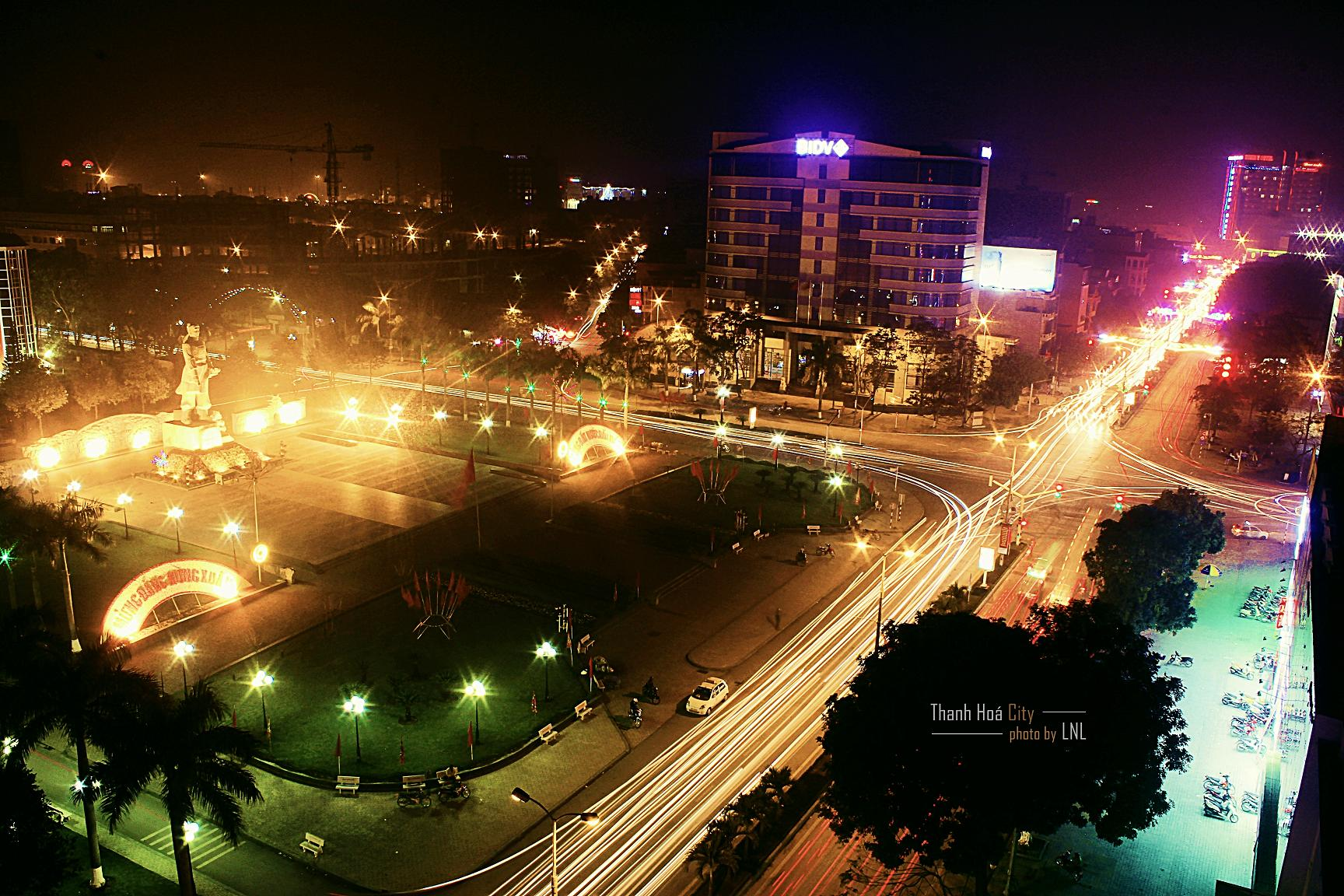
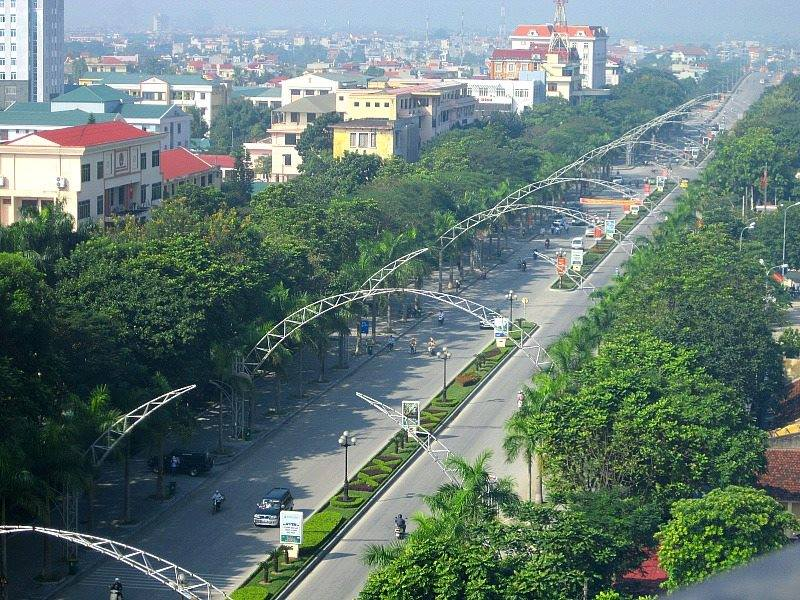
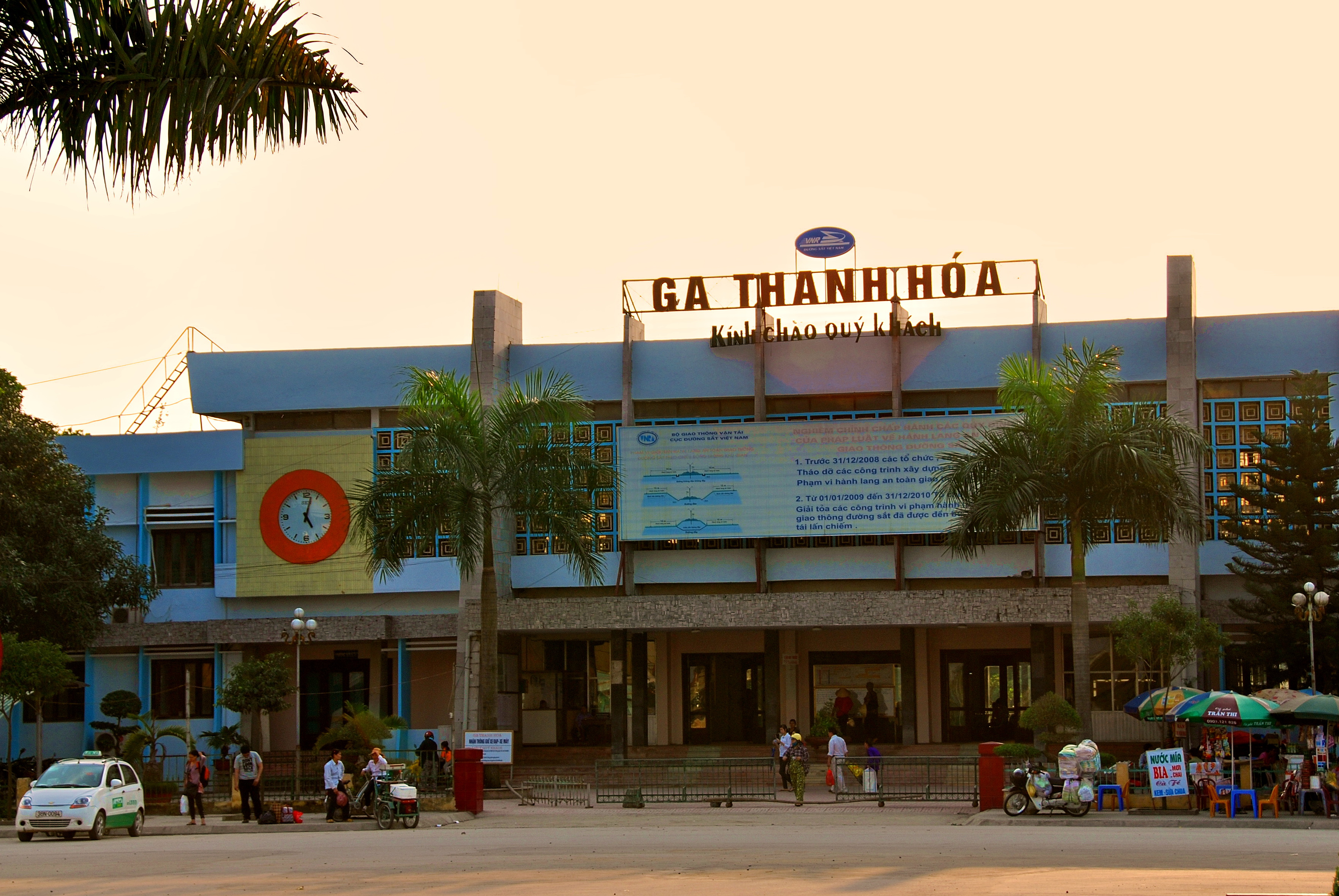
- From top to bottom, from left to right: Hàm Rồng Bridge, Lê Lợi monument, Thanh Hóa city at night, Lê Lợi Avenue, Thanh Hóa Station

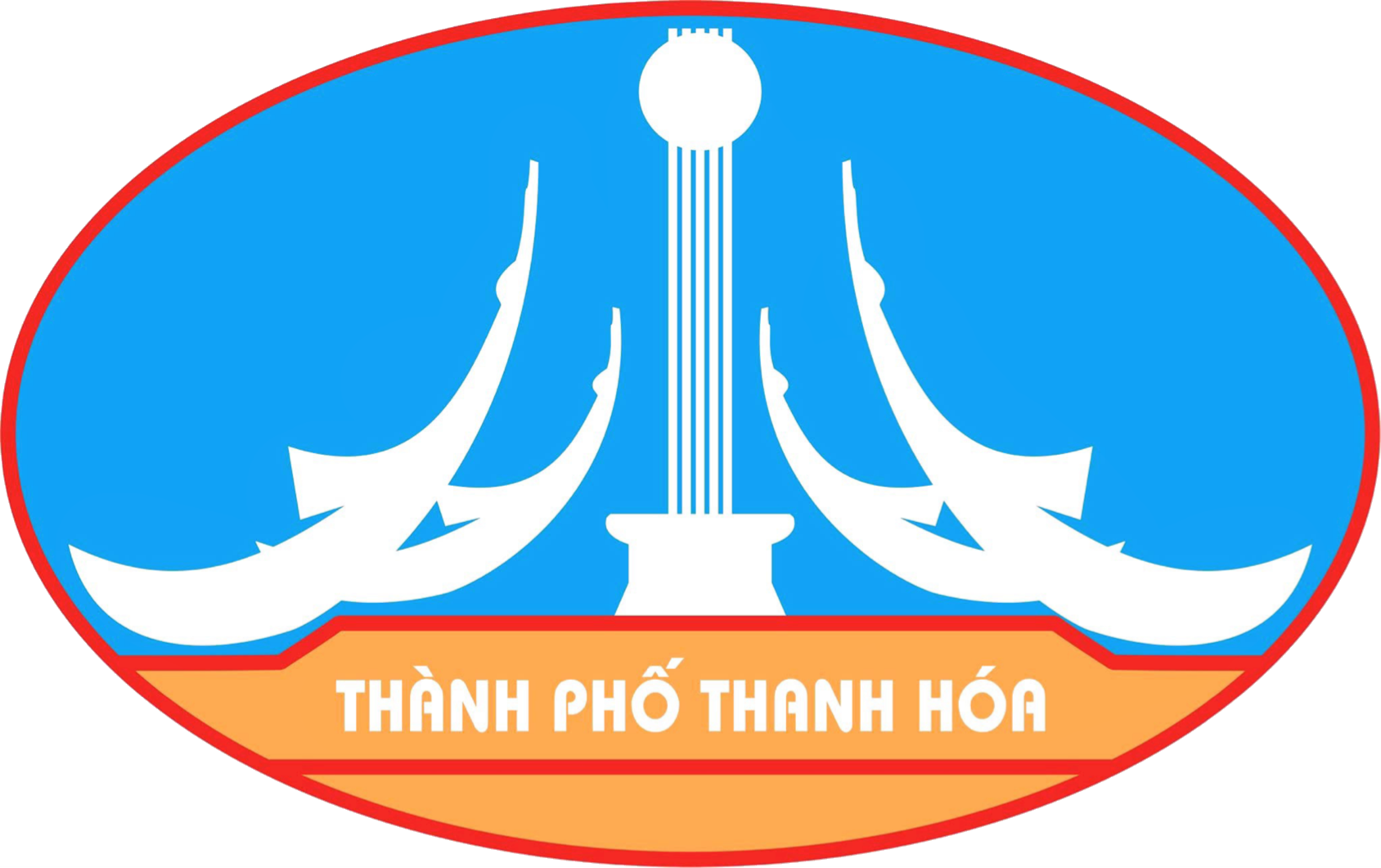
- Seal
- Nickname: Hạc Thành
- Interactive map of Thanh Hóa
- Location within Vietnam
- Coordinates: 19°48′27″N 105°46′35″E
- Country: Vietnam
- Province: Thanh Hóa
- Founded: 1994

Government
  - Type: Provincial city
  - Party Secretary: Nguyễn Xuân Phi
  - President: Đào Trọng Quy
  - Federal Council Chairman: Nguyễn Xuân Phi

Area
  - Provincial city (Class-1): 228.22 km^{2} (88.12 sq mi)
  - Urban: 6,145 km^{2} (2,373 sq mi)

Population (2024)
  - Provincial city (Class-1): 850,000
  - Density: 3,700/km^{2} (9,600/sq mi)
- Time zone: UTC+7 (ICT)
  - Summer (DST): UTC+7 (ICT)
- Area code: +84 (37)
- Climate: Cwa
- Website: thanhhoacity.gov.vn

Thanh Hóa (Vietnamese: [tʰajŋ̟ hwǎː]) is the capital of Thanh Hóa Province. The city is situated in the east of the province on the Ma River (Sông Mã), about 150 kilometers (93 miles) south of capital Hanoi and 1560 kilometers (969 miles) north of Ho Chi Minh City. Thanh Hoa became one of the most populous cities in North Central Coast after expanding in 2012, with a population of approximately 400,000. Thanh Hoa township was upgraded to Thanh Hoa City in 1994 and has been the historical center of politics, economy, culture, education and entertainment of Thanh Hóa Province.

== Overview ==
Thanh Hoá is a new developing city, although its central position was established centuries before. Nowadays, provincial administrators are trying to build and gentrify the city so that its important role for the whole province and even North Central Coast is emphasised.

== History ==
The Citadel of the Hồ Dynasty was the capital of the Trần dynasty from 1398 to 1400 and the Hồ dynasty from 1400 to 1407.

The Thanh Hóa town and region were an area of popular support for Lê Lợi and the Lê dynasty in the 1580s, leading to the reestablishment of the southern court near the town following the withdrawal of Ming dynasty armies. After 1945 the city was a stronghold of the Communist-led Viet Minh. In January 1946 the Viet Minh transported all local cells of the VNQDD to the city. During the Vietnam War, US strategic bombing destroyed much of the buildings and infrastructure; the whole city has been totally rebuilt since then.

== Geography ==
=== Topography ===
Thanh Hoá city is located in centre of Thanh Hoá's plain with many scattered rocky mountains surround. There are two main mountains along the city: Hàm Rồng and Mật Sơn. Hàm Rồng mountain begins from Thiệu Dương commune, which is about 8 km from city centre, along the right bank of the Ma River to Hàm Rồng Thanh Hóa Bridge pier. Ham Rong mountain has 99 peaks and had become an entrench for air defensive in Operation Rolling Thunder. Ma River is the longest river flow through the city, meandering around Ham Rong mountain before flowing to South East Asian sea. In addition, five canals were dug to support irrigation and response to drought, and to mitigate flooding.

== Climate ==
=== Temperature ===
Possessing a marginal humid subtropical climate (Köppen Cwa), Thanh Hóa city has four seasons with two distinctive hot and cold atmospheres in a year.

- The hot season: Beginning in late spring to mid-autumn (April to mid-November), weather is extreme heat with sunny and sometime Foehn wind. The highest temperature may reach over 40 °C or 104 °F. In this period, flood and drought occur frequently.
- The cool season: Beginning in November to the end of March the following year. The atmosphere is mostly cloudy and dried with cool monsoon from Northeast direction. The lowest temperature may down to 5 °C or 41 °F

Annual mean temperature is between 23.3 and 23.6 °C or 73.9 and 74.5 °F.

=== Monsoon ===
Thanh Hóa city is located in coast region so it is affected by three seasonal winds, which are mainly referred to distinctive wind directions.

- Northeast direction wind: Blowing from Siberia, and usually comes in January. The winds causes the coolest period of winter.
- Foehn wind: Blowing from Bengal passing on Laos to North Central Coast Vietnam. Thus, it's called "Gió Lào" in Vietnamese referred to the wind from Laos direction. The wind occurs in summer, normally July or August and causes the hottest atmosphere in a year.
- Southeast direction wind (Gió Nồm): Blowing from sea and occurring in Summer. At the heat of hot season, the winds brings fresh atmosphere to land and cool down temperature

==== Rainfall ====
Annual rainfall average is 1,730 to 1,980 millimetres or 68 to 78 inches.

Climate data for Thanh Hóa
Month	Jan	Feb	Mar	Apr	May	Jun	Jul	Aug	Sep	Oct	Nov	Dec	Year
Record high °C (°F)	33.0 (91.4)	35.8 (96.4)	38.9 (102.0)	41.5 (106.7)	41.9 (107.4)	41.3 (106.3)	42.0 (107.6)	41.8 (107.2)	38.6 (101.5)	37.2 (99.0)	35.2 (95.4)	31.4 (88.5)	42.0 (107.6)
Mean daily maximum °C (°F)	20.1 (68.2)	20.5 (68.9)	22.8 (73.0)	27.1 (80.8)	31.3 (88.3)	33.2 (91.8)	33.2 (91.8)	32.1 (89.8)	30.7 (87.3)	28.5 (83.3)	25.5 (77.9)	22.1 (71.8)	27.3 (81.1)
Daily mean °C (°F)	17.1 (62.8)	17.8 (64.0)	20.0 (68.0)	23.7 (74.7)	27.3 (81.1)	29.1 (84.4)	29.2 (84.6)	28.3 (82.9)	27.1 (80.8)	24.9 (76.8)	21.8 (71.2)	18.6 (65.5)	23.7 (74.7)
Mean daily minimum °C (°F)	15.1 (59.2)	16.1 (61.0)	18.3 (64.9)	21.6 (70.9)	24.7 (76.5)	26.3 (79.3)	26.3 (79.3)	25.7 (78.3)	24.6 (76.3)	22.4 (72.3)	19.3 (66.7)	16.1 (61.0)	21.4 (70.5)
Record low °C (°F)	5.4 (41.7)	6.6 (43.9)	7.7 (45.9)	11.4 (52.5)	15.2 (59.4)	19.5 (67.1)	20.0 (68.0)	18.9 (66.0)	16.3 (61.3)	13.2 (55.8)	6.7 (44.1)	5.6 (42.1)	5.4 (41.7)
Average rainfall mm (inches)	23.3 (0.92)	21.4 (0.84)	41.4 (1.63)	62.1 (2.44)	142.8 (5.62)	179.6 (7.07)	195.5 (7.70)	278.4 (10.96)	394.1 (15.52)	267.4 (10.53)	77.3 (3.04)	28.1 (1.11)	1,711.5 (67.38)
Average rainy days	9.6	11.7	14.5	11.2	12.2	12.0	12.0	15.3	15.1	12.4	7.6	6.2	139.9
Average relative humidity (%)	84.9	87.8	89.5	89.1	84.1	80.6	81.0	84.9	85.5	83.4	81.9	81.3	84.5
Mean monthly sunshine hours	77.5	52.2	56.1	110.6	198.7	191.8	209.9	175.1	161.3	154.1	129.4	112.3	1,630.4
Source 1: Vietnam Institute for Building Science and Technology
Source 2: The Yearbook of Indochina (1932-1933)

== Administrative Subdivision ==
By the time 2012, Thanh Hoá city had 12 inner wards and 6 outer communes. After expansion in February 2012, the city merged some subdivisions from other nearby districts and that extended total of urban subdivisions up to 37. Thanh Hoá city currently has 20 inner wards and 17 outer communes.

20 Inner Wards	Area	Population	Density	17 Outer Communes	Area	Population	Density
An Hoạch	2.55	5,953	2,335	Ðông Hưng	4.36	3,723	854
Ba Ðình	0.7	12,383	16,852	Ðông Lĩnh	8.83	9,026	1,022
Ðiện Biên	0.68	9,719	14,293	Ðông Tân	4.51	7,401	124
Ðông Thọ	3.64	13,902	3,809	Ðông Vinh	4.38	3,347	764
Ðông Cương	6.8	16,800	1,313	Hoằng Anh	3.49	4,100	1,175
Ðông Hải	6.84	16,100	2,354	Hoàng Ðại	4.67	4,902	910
Ðông Hương	3.37	17,000	5,045	Hoằng Long	2.29	2,571	1,123
Ðông Sơn	0.84	9,622	11,154	Hoằng Lý	2.9	3,063	1,056
Ðông Vệ	4.78	16,107	3,370	Hoằng Quang	6.28	6,098	971
Hàm Rồng	4.18	5,022	1,201	Quảng Cát	6.9	5,004	790
Lam Sơn	0.86	12,676	14,740	Quảng Ðông	6.6	5,089	780
Nam Ngạn	1.58	8,475	5,363	Quảng Phú	6.6	7,054	1,120
Ngọc Trạo	0.54	11,183	20,709	Quảng Tâm	3.7	9,619	2,710
Phú Sơn	1.93	8,453	4,380	Quảng Thành	5.6	7,918	1,512
Quảng Hưng	5.73	7,236	1,263	Thiệu Dương	5.66	9,604	1,706
Quảng Thành	8.49	20,000	2,356	Thiệu Khánh	5.38	9,577	1,790
Quảng Thắng	3.55	5,927	1,670	Thiệu Vân	3.7	5,861	1,620
Tào Xuyên	2.75	6,520	2,965	Total of Communes	85.85	103,127	1,202
Tân Sơn	0.78	11,114	14,249				
Trường Thi	0.86	11,926	13,867				
Total of Wards	61.45	226,118	3,680				

Note: Area: km2; Density: People/km2 (Statistics in 2009)

After expansion, Thanh Hoá city's population had rise up from 207,698 to 406,550 people (2014). According to urban development plan in 2012, the estimated population will be approximate 1 million in 2030 with 800,000 urban people.

== Thanh Hóa Citadel ==
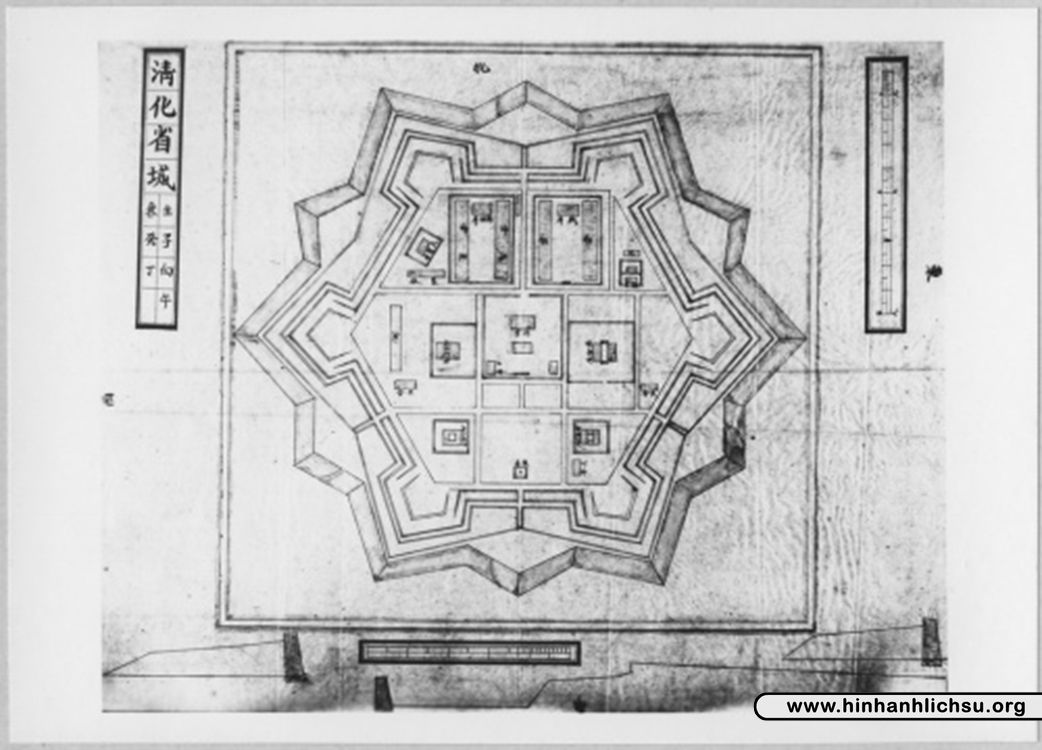
Drawing of Thanh Hóa citadel in the Nguyễn dynasty

A star shaped fortress was built in 1804 during the reign of Emperor Gia Long of Nguyễn dynasty to improve defense of the city. It was French-influenced and defended the residents with a moat. It is now a residential area covering Ðiện Biên and Tân Sơn wards.

== Economy ==
According to statistics from 2013, the GDP sector composition of the city's economy was the following:

- Agricultural sector: 7.6%
- Industrial sector: 46%
- Service sector: 46.4%

The annual economic growth rate was 15% (2013). Total of capital development fund estimated 12,665 thousand billion VND (~650 million USD), export volume estimated 504 million USD. State budgets revenue is 1,436 thousand billion VND(~70 million USD). GDP per capital is 3,930 USD.

Currently, there are three industrial regions locally:

- Le Mon industrial region: Is situated in the east and 5 km from city centre. The industrial hub was established in 2005 with planned scale 87 hectare. Main industries concentrate on high-tech applications, manufacturing and processing raw materials within province, agricultural, forestry and fishery, mechanical assembly, electronic and telecommunication devices,... Some FDI organizations invested and operate are Sunjade company (Taiwan), Sakura company, Yotsuba Dress company (Japan), Vinamilk,...
- Dinh Huong industrial region: Is located 2 km from north city centre.

== Transportation ==
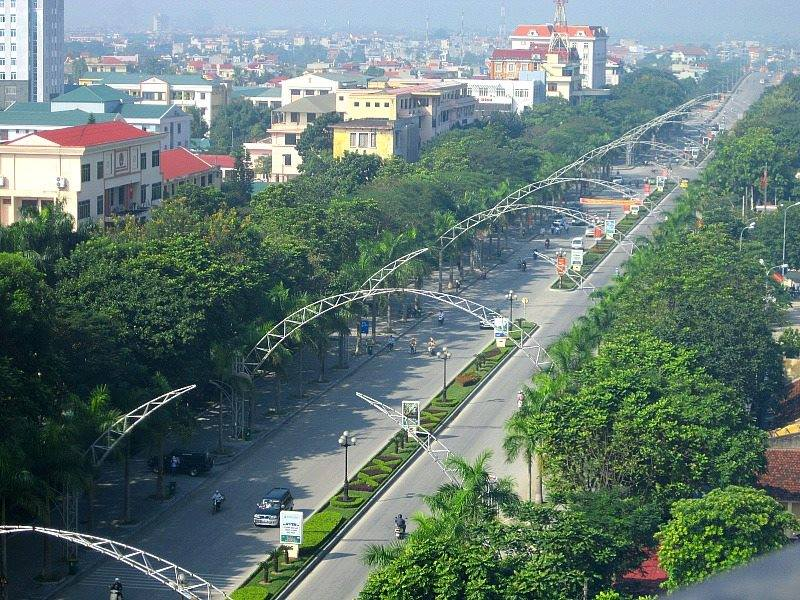
Lê Lợi Avenue

As central position of province, Thanh Hoá city is the heart of transport network, where every essential transportation modes are aggregated such as North–South Railway (Vietnam), National Route 1A (Vietnam), National Route 47, buses system and many other provincial routes.

Le Mon port is situated beside Ma River and 4 km from city centre east. This river port supports and provides transportation for Le Mon industrial region.

In February 2013, Tho Xuan Airport, which is located 45 km to the east from city, was implemented and upgrade to turn into a mixed civilian/military airport. This airport became the place provide air transport services for Thanh Hoá city.
