= Family tree of Cambodian monarchs =

== Chenla (550–802) ==
Viravarman
Bhavavarman I r.550-590?	Mahendra -Varman r.590-611
Isanavarman r.611-640
Jayavarman I r.640–681	Jayadevi r.681–713

== Angkor Period (802–1431) ==
=== Varman dynasty (802–1336) ===
Jayavarman II c. 770–835 r.802-835	Dharanindra -devi	Prithi- vindra -varman	Mahipativarman; Ruler of Chenla r.790-802
Jayavarman III r.835–877	Indravarman I r.877/78-889/890	Indradevi
Yasovarman I r.889–910	Mahendradevi
Udayaditya -Varman I r.1002	Jayaviravarman r.1002-1011	Harshavarman I ?-923 r.910–923	Ishanavarman II r.923-928?	Jayadevi	Jayavarman IV r.928-941	Rajendra -Varman II r.944-968
Hiranyavarman	Harshavarman II ?-944 r.941-944	Jayavarman V r.968–1001
□	Dharanindra -Varman I r.1107-1113	Jayavarman VI r.1080-1107	□	Suryavarman I r.1006-1050
Ksitindratiya	Mahidharaditya	Harsha -Varman III r.1066-1080	Udayaditya -Varman II r.1050-1066
Suryavarman II ?-1145/1150 r.1113-1145/1150	Dharanindra -Varman II r.1150-1160	Chudamani
Indradevi	Jayavarman VII; 1125–1218 r.c. 1181–1218	Yasovarman II r.1160-1166
Indravarman II c. 1215-1243
Jayavarman VIII r.1243-1295
Indrajaya -Varman r.1308-1327	Indravarman III r.1295-1308	Indra -bhupesvera Cuda
Jayavarman IX r.1327-1336
Chandravati

=== Trasak Paem dynasty (1336–1431) ===
Chandravati	Trasak Paem r.1336-1340
Nippean Bat r.1340-1346	Sithean; Reachea r.1346-1347
Soryavong I r.1357-1363	Lompong; Racha r.1347-1352
Soryavong II	Borom; Reachea I r.1363-1373	Thomma Saok r.1373-1393
Ponhea Yat; 1396–1466 r.1432-1463

== Cambodia (1431–present) ==
Ponhea Yat; 1396–1466 r.1432-1463
Noreay Reachea r.1463–1469	Reachea; Ramathipatei r.1469–1475	Thommo; Reachea I r.1476–1504	Pichey; Neak
Srei; Soriyotei II r.1472–1475	Ang Chan I r.1516–1556	Srey; Sukonthor r.1504–1512	Snam-ek	Ney Khon r.1512–1521
Barom; Reachea I ?-1567 r.1556-1567
Satha I r.1567-1575	Srei; Soriyopear II r.1602-1618	Barom; Reachea VI r.1600
Chey; Chettha I r.1576–1594	Ponhea Ton r.1597-1599	Kaev Hua r.1600-1603	Chey; Chettha II; 1576–1628 r.1618-1627	Outey r.1628–1642
Ponhea To r.1628–1630	Ang Tong r.1630-1640	Ponea; Chan r.1642–1658	Ang Sur I 1628-1672 r.1658–1672	Ang Non; 1615-1642 r.1640–1642	Ang Im ?-1658
Kaev; Hua II; 1652-1677 r.1673-1674	Chey; Chettha IV; 1656-1725 r.1675-95/96- 1699/1700-02 /1703-06	Chey; Chettha III; 1639-1673 r.1672–1673	Ang Non r.1674
Ang Yong; 1672-1696 r.1695–1696	Thommo; Reachea III; 1690-1747 r.1702-03/1706 –09/1738-47	Ang Em I 1674-1731 r.1699–1700 /1710–1722
Ang Tong r.1692-1757 r.1755–1758	Thommo; Reachea IV; 1706-1748 r.1747	Ang Sngoun; 1709-1755 r.1749–1755	Ang Chey; 1702-1749 r.1722–1729/ 1729–1736/1749
Ang Sor; 1707-1753	Ang Non r.1775–1779
Ang Ton; 1739-1777 r.1758–1775
Ang Eng; 1773–1796 r.1779-1796
Ang Chan II; 1792–1834 r.1806-1834	Ang Duong; 1796–1860 r.1840–1859
Ang Mey; 1815-1874 r.1834–1840	Norodom; 1834–1904 r.1860-1904	Sisowath; 1840–1927 r.1904-1927
Norodom; Phangangam; 1874-1944	Norodom; Sutharot; 1872-1945	Sisowath; Monivong; 1875–1941 r.1927-1941	Kanviman; Norleak; Tevi; 1876–1912	Sisowath Essaravong; 1858-1906
Norodom; Suramarit; 1896–1960 r.1955-1960	Sisowath; Kossamak; 1904–1975	Sisowath; Monireth; 1909–1975	Sisowath; Monipong; 1912–1956	Sisowath Rothary; 1878-1946
Norodom; Monineath; 1936–	Norodom; Sihanouk; 1922–2012 r.1941-1955 /1993-2004	Sisowath; Sirik Matak; 1914-1975
Norodom; Sihamoni; 1953− r.2004−	Norodom; Ranariddh; 1944—2021
