= Post-Angkor period =

1431–1863 middle period of Cambodian history

Kingdom of Cambodia ព្រះរាជាណាចក្រកម្ពុជា (Khmer) Preăh Réachéanachâkr Kâmpŭchéa
- 1431–1863
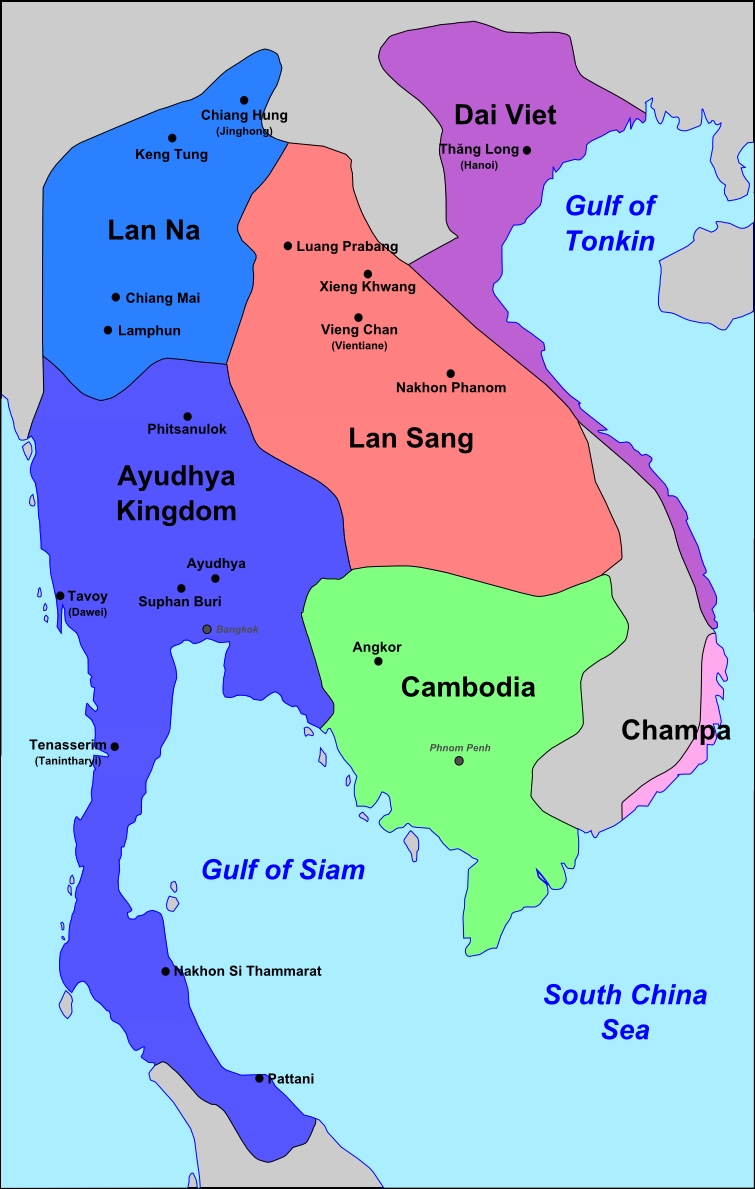
- Cambodia and its neighbours, 1540
- Capital: Chaktomuk (1431–1525); Longvek (1525–1594); Srey Sarchor (1594–1620); Oudong (1620–1863)
- Common languages: Middle Khmer (until 1777); Modern Khmer (from 1777)
- Religion: Theravada Buddhism
- Demonyms: Cambodian; Khmer
- Government: Absolute monarchy
- Monarch
  - 1431–1463 (first): Ponhea Yat
  - 1516–1566: Ang Chan I
  - 1566–1576: Baraminreachea
  - 1603–1618: Srei Soriyopear
  - 1618–1628: Chey Chettha II
  - 1848–1860: Ang Duong
  - 1860–1863 (last): Ang Voddey
- Historical era: Early modern era
  - Siege of Angkor: 1431
  - Spanish invasion of Cambodia: 1593–1597
  - Siamese conquest of Longvek: 1594
  - Vietnamese conquest of the Mekong Delta: 17th century
  - Start of Oudong era: 1620
  - Cambodian–Dutch War: 1643–1644
  - Siamese conquest of Western Cambodia: 1795
  - Nguyễn rule: 1834–1847
  - French protectorate of Cambodia: 11 August 1863

Population
  - 1500: 1,224,000
  - 1600: 1,419,000
  - 1700: 1,650,000
  - 1800: 2,090,000
- Currency: Cambodian tical
Preceded by	Succeeded by
Khmer Empire	French Cambodia
- Today part of: Cambodia; Vietnam; Thailand

The post-Angkor period of Cambodia (Khmer: ប្រទេសកម្ពុជាក្រោយសម័យអង្គរ), also called the Middle period, refers to the historical era from the early 15th century to 1863, the beginning of the French protectorate of Cambodia. As reliable sources (for the 15th and 16th centuries, in particular) are very rare, a defensible and conclusive explanation that relates to concrete events that manifest the decline of the Khmer Empire, recognised unanimously by the scientific community, has so far not been produced. However, most modern historians have approached a consensus in which several distinct and gradual changes of religious, dynastic, administrative and military nature, environmental problems and ecological imbalance coincided with shifts of power in Indochina and must all be taken into account to make an interpretation. In recent years scholars' focus has shifted increasingly towards human–environment interactions and the ecological consequences, including natural disasters, such as flooding and droughts.

Stone epigraphy in temples, which had been the primary source for Khmer history, is already a rarity throughout the 13th century, ends in the third decade of the fourteenth, and does not resume until the mid-16th century. Recording of the Royal Chronology discontinues with King Jayavarman IX Parameshwara (or Jayavarma-Paramesvara), who reigned from 1327 to 1336. There exists not a single contemporary record of even a king’s name for over 200 years. Construction and maintenance of monumental temple architecture had come to a standstill after Jayavarman VII's reign. According to author Michael Vickery there only exist external sources for Cambodia’s 15th century, the Chinese Ming Shilu ("Veritable Records") and the earliest Royal Chronicle of Ayutthaya, which must be interpreted with greatest caution.

The single incident which undoubtedly reflects reality, the central reference point for the entire 15th century, is a Siamese intervention of some undisclosed nature at the capital Yasodharapura (Angkor Thom) around the year 1431. Historians relate the event to the shift of Cambodia's political centre southward to the river port region of Phnom Penh and later Longvek.

Sources for the 16th century are more numerous, although still coming from outside of Cambodia. The kingdom's new capital was Longvek, on the Mekong, which prospered as an integral part of the 16th century Asian maritime trade network, via which the first contact with European explorers and adventurers occurred. The rivalry with the Ayutthaya Kingdom in the west resulted in several conflicts, including the Siamese conquest of Longvek in 1594. The Vietnamese southward expansion reached Prei Nokor/Saigon at the Mekong Delta in the 17th century. This event initiates the slow process of Cambodia losing access to the seas and independent marine trade.

Siamese and Vietnamese dominance intensified during the 17th and 18th century, provoking frequent displacements of the seat of power as the Khmer monarch's authority decreased to the state of a vassal. Both powers alternately demanded subservience and tribute from the Cambodian court. In the mid 19th century, with dynasties in Siam and Vietnam firmly established, Cambodia was placed under joint suzerainty between the two regional empires, thereby the Cambodian kingdom lost its national sovereignty. British agent John Crawfurd states: "...the King of that ancient Kingdom is ready to throw himself under the protection of any European nation..." To save Cambodia from being incorporated into Vietnam and Siam, King Ang Duong agreed to colonial France's offers of protection, which took effect with King Norodom Prohmbarirak signing and officially recognising the French protectorate on 11 August 1863.

== Historical background and causes ==
The Khmer Empire had steadily gained hegemonic power over most of mainland Southeast Asia since its early days in the 8th and 9th centuries. Rivalries and wars with its western neighbour, the Pagan Kingdom of the Mon people of modern-day Burma were less numerous and decisive than those with Champa to the east. The Khmer and Cham Hindu kingdoms remained for centuries preoccupied with each other's containment and it has been argued that one of the Khmer's military objectives was "...in the reigns of the Angkor kings Suryavarman II and Jayavarman VII." the conquest of the Cham ports, "...important in the international trade of the time". Even though the Khmer suffered a number of serious defeats, such as the Cham invasion of Angkor in 1177, the empire quickly recovered, capable to strike back, as it was the case in 1181 with the invasion of the Cham city-state of Vijaya.

Mongol incursions into southern China and political and cultural pressure caused the southward migration of the Tai people and Thai people and their settling on the upper Chao Phraya River in the 12th century. The Sukhothai Kingdom and later the Ayutthaya Kingdom were established and "...conquered the Khmers of the upper and central Menam [Chao Phraya River] valley and greatly extended their territory..."

=== Military setbacks ===
Although a number of sources, such as the Cambodian Royal Chronicles and the Royal chronicles of Ayutthaya contain recordings of military expeditions and raids with associated dates and the names of sovereigns and warlords, several influential scholars, such as David Chandler and Michael Vickery doubt the accuracy and reliability of these texts. Other authors, however, criticise this rigid "overall assessment".

David Chandler states in A Global Encyclopedia of Historical Writing, Volume 2: "Michael Vickery has argued that Cambodian chronicles, including this one, that treat events earlier than 1550 cannot be verified, and were often copied from Thai chronicles about Thailand..." Linguist Jean-Michel Filippi concludes: "The chronology of Cambodian history itself is more a chrono-ideology with a pivotal role offered to Angkor." Similarities apply to Thai chronological records, with the notable example of the Ramkhamhaeng controversy.

According to the Siamese Royal chronicles of Paramanuchitchinorot, clashes occurred in 1350, around 1380, 1418 and 1431.

"In 1350/51; probably April 1350 King Ramadhipati had his son Ramesvara attack the capital of the King of the Kambujas (Angkor) and had Paramaraja (Pha-ngua) of Suphanburi advance to support him. The Kambuja capital was taken and many families were removed to the capital Ayudhya.

At that time, [around 1380] the ruler of Kambuja came to attack Chonburi, to carry away families from the provinces eastwards to Chanthaburi, amounting to about six or seven thousand persons who returned [with the Cambodian armies] to Kambuja. So the King attacked Kambuja and, having captured it, returned to the capitol.[sic]

Then [1418] he went to attack Angkor, the capital of Kambuja, and captured it."

However, despite traditional narratives, Cambodia in the 16th century proved to be able to extend its military power to neighboring states. In the 1570s, Cambodia sent punitive land and sea expeditions to Siam and successfully sacked and looted a number of Siamese cities and villages, bringing thousands of Siamese slaves and loot back to Cambodia. On two occasions, Cambodia attempted to besiege the Siamese capital of Ayutthaya, raiding her outskirts, but ultimately failing to conquer Ayutthaya.

=== Land or people debate ===
Siamese sources record the habit of capturing sizeable numbers of inhabitants from the capital cities and centres of civilisation of the defeated parties in Chiang Mai and Angkor which can be assumed to have accelerated the cultural decline.

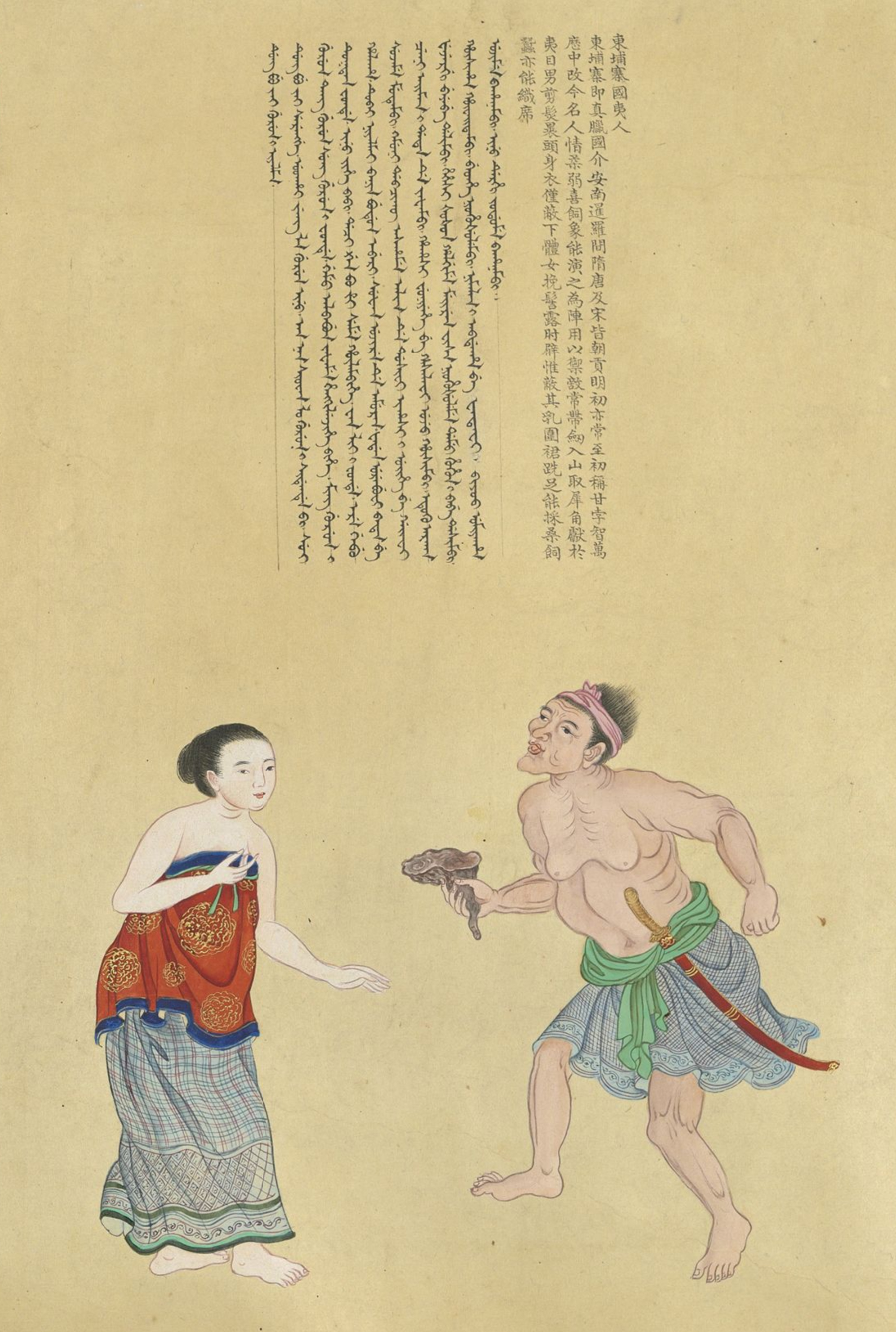
Cambodian people in 18th century in chinese painting Portraits of Periodical Offering by Xie Sui.

Author Michael Vickery debates the degree of importance of this subject in his publication "Two Historical Records of the Kingdom of Vientiane - Land or People?": "It is not at all certain that Angkor desired manpower in central Thailand, rather than simply control over the rich agricultural resources." and "...whether the political economy of early Southeast Asia resulted in rulers being more concerned with control of land or control of people..." and "...both sides of this discussion have offered ad hoc, case-by-case pronunciamentos, which are then repeated like mantra... Critical discussion of the question is long overdue..."

Contrary views

Author Akin Rabibhadana, who quotes Ram Khamhaeng: "One particular characteristic of the historical Southeast Asian mainland states was the lack of manpower. The need for manpower is well illustrated by events following each war between Thailand and her neighbours. The victorious side always carried off a large number of people from the conquered territory. Whole villages were often moved into the territory of the conqueror, where they were assimilated and became the population of the conqueror."

David K. Wyatt: "As much as anything else, the Tai müang was an instrument for the efficient use of manpower in a region where land was plentiful in relation to labor and agricultural technology."

Baker and Phongpaichit argues that, "War in the region [Southeast Asia] was... an enterprise to acquire wealth, people, and scarce urban resources."

Bronson states, "No farmers in any region outside southern and eastern Asia could produce as much food with as little labor from the same amount of land."

And Aung-Thwin wrote: "Much of the warfare of early Southeast Asia witnessed the victor carrying off half the population of the vanquished foe and later resettling them on his own soil. Pagan was located in the dry belt of Burma, and depended mainly upon irrigated agriculture for its economic base. Land was plentiful but labor was extremely difficult to obtain."

=== Dynastic and religious factors ===
The complete transition from the early Khmer kingdom to the firm establishment of the Mahidharapura dynasty (first king Jayavarman VI, 1080 to 1107), which originated west of the Dângrêk Mountains at Phimai in the Mun river valley lasted several decades. Some historians argue, that these kings failed to acquire absolute central administrative control and had limited access to local resources. The dynasty discontinued "ritual policy" and genealogical traditions. Further momentum ensued as Mahayana Buddhism was eventually tolerated and several Buddhist kings emerged, including Suryavarman I, Rajendravarman II and Jayavarman VII.

These rulers were not considered, and did not consider themselves, as divine, which lead to a shift in perception of royal authority, central power and a loss of dynastic prestige with respect to foreign rulers. Effectively the royal subjects were given permission to re-direct attention and support from the Hindu state of military dominance with its consecrated leader, the "Varman"—protector king, towards the inner-worldly alternative with the contradictory teachings of the Buddhist temple. Indravarman III (c. 1295-1308) adopted Theravada Buddhism as the state religion, which implied an even more passive, introverted focus towards individual and personal responsibility to accumulate merit to achieve nirvana.

Miriam T. Stark argues that competition and rivalries in royal succession, usurpers and "second grade" rulers characterised the kingdom since the 9th century. Periods of "...consolidation alternated with political fragmentation [as] only few rulers were able to wrest control from the provincial level".

Debate remains on the progress of the imperial society as the kingdom grew and occupied foreign lands. Authors present numerous theories about the relationship between Southeast Asian kings and the populace's loyalties, nature and degree of identity, the Mandala concept and the effects of changing state-religion. Scholar Ben Kiernan highlights a tendency to identify with a universal religion rather than to adhere to the concept of a people or nation, as he refers to author Victor Lieberman in: Blood and Soil: Modern Genocide 1500-2000 "[local courts make]...no formal demand, that rulers be of the same ethnicity as their subjects"

=== Environmental and infrastructural breakdown ===
Historians increasingly maintain the idea that decline was caused by progressing ecological imbalance of the delicate irrigation network and canal system of "...a profoundly ritualized, elaborate system of hydraulic engineering..." at Angkor's Yasodharapura. Recent studies indicate that the irrigation system was overworked and gradually started to silt up, amplified by large scale deforestation. Permanent monument construction projects and maintenance of temples instead of canals and dykes put an enormous strain on the royal resources and drained thousands of slaves and common people from the public workforce and caused tax deficits.

Author Heng L. Thung addressed common sense in "Geohydrology and the decline of Angkor" as he sums things up: "...the preoccupation of the Khmers with the need to store water for the long dry season. Each household needed a pond to provide drinking and household water for both man and beast. The barays [reservoirs] of Angkor were simply the manifestation of the need of an urban population. Water was the fountain of life for Angkor; a disruption in its supply would be fatal."

Recent Lidar (Light detection and ranging) Geo-Scans of Angkor have produced new data, that have caused several "Eureka moments" and "have profoundly transformed our understanding of urbanism in the region of Angkor". Results of dendrochronological studies imply prolonged periods of drought between the 14th and 15th centuries. As a result, recent re-interpretations of the epoch put greater emphasis on human–environment interactions and the ecological consequences.

=== Growth of international maritime trade ===
Some historians have argued that an important reason for the Angkor court's move to the lower Mekong Delta was due to the growth of international maritime trade with the rest of the world. Angkor, being primarily inland and largely agricultural, became increasingly irrelevant to the global markets in comparison to the later maritime Cambodian capitals at Longvek, Oudong, and later Phnom Penh. The arrival of the Europeans to Southeast Asia in the 16th century and the colonization of the Americas globalized world trade and made Southeast Asia more connected to the global world financially than any time previously. Access to the sea for the Cambodian peoples to access global trade became paramount.

== Chaktomuk era ==
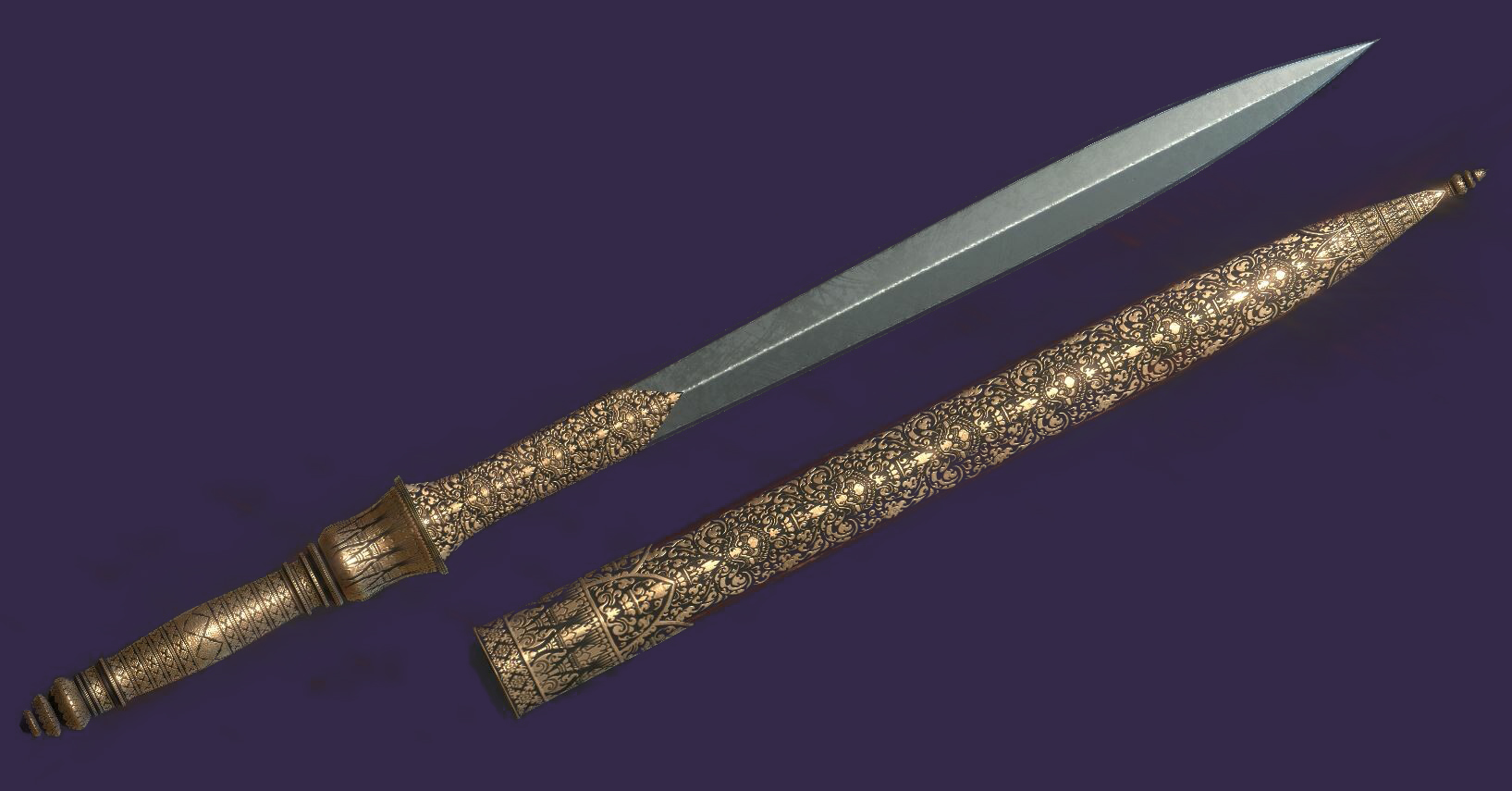
Cambodia royal sword (preah khan)

Following the abandonment of the capital Yasodharapura and the Angkorian sites, the Angkor elites established a new capital around two-hundred kilometres to the south-east on the site which is modern day Phnom Penh, at the confluence of the Mekong and the Tonle Sap river. Thus, it controlled the river commerce of the Khmer heartland, upper Siam and the Laotian kingdoms with access, by way of the Mekong Delta, to the international trade routes that linked the Chinese coast, the South China Sea, and the Indian Ocean. Unlike its inland predecessor, this society was more open to the outside world and relied mainly on commerce as the source of wealth. The adoption of maritime trade with China during the Ming dynasty (1368–1644) provided lucrative opportunities for members of the Cambodian elite who controlled royal trading monopolies.

Historians consent that as the capital ceased to exist, the temples at Angkor remained as central for the nation as they always had been. David P. Chandler: "The 1747 inscription is the last extensive one at Angkor Wat and reveals the importance of the temple in Cambodian religious life barely a century before it was "discovered" by the French."

== Longvek era ==
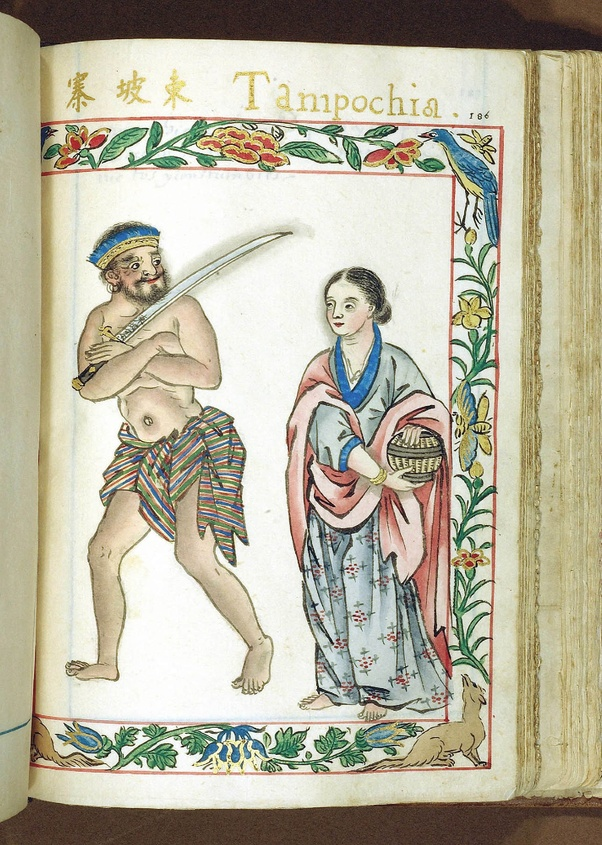
yl"柬埔寨 Tampochia" - Couple from Cambodia - Boxer Codex (1590) Observed by the Colonial Spanish Authorities in Manila, Philippines around 1590 AD.

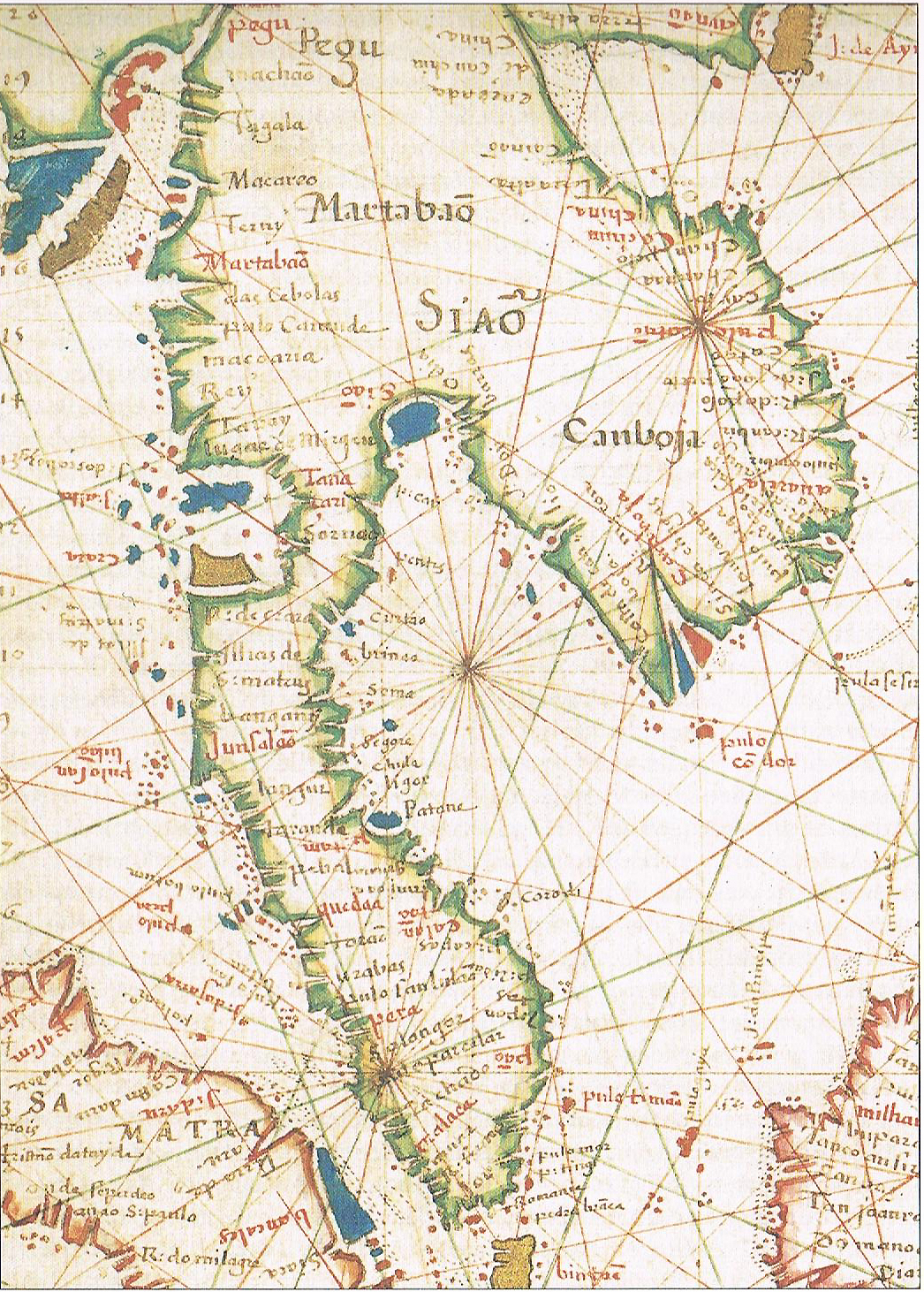
Depiction of Cambodia on a Portuguese map (17th century)

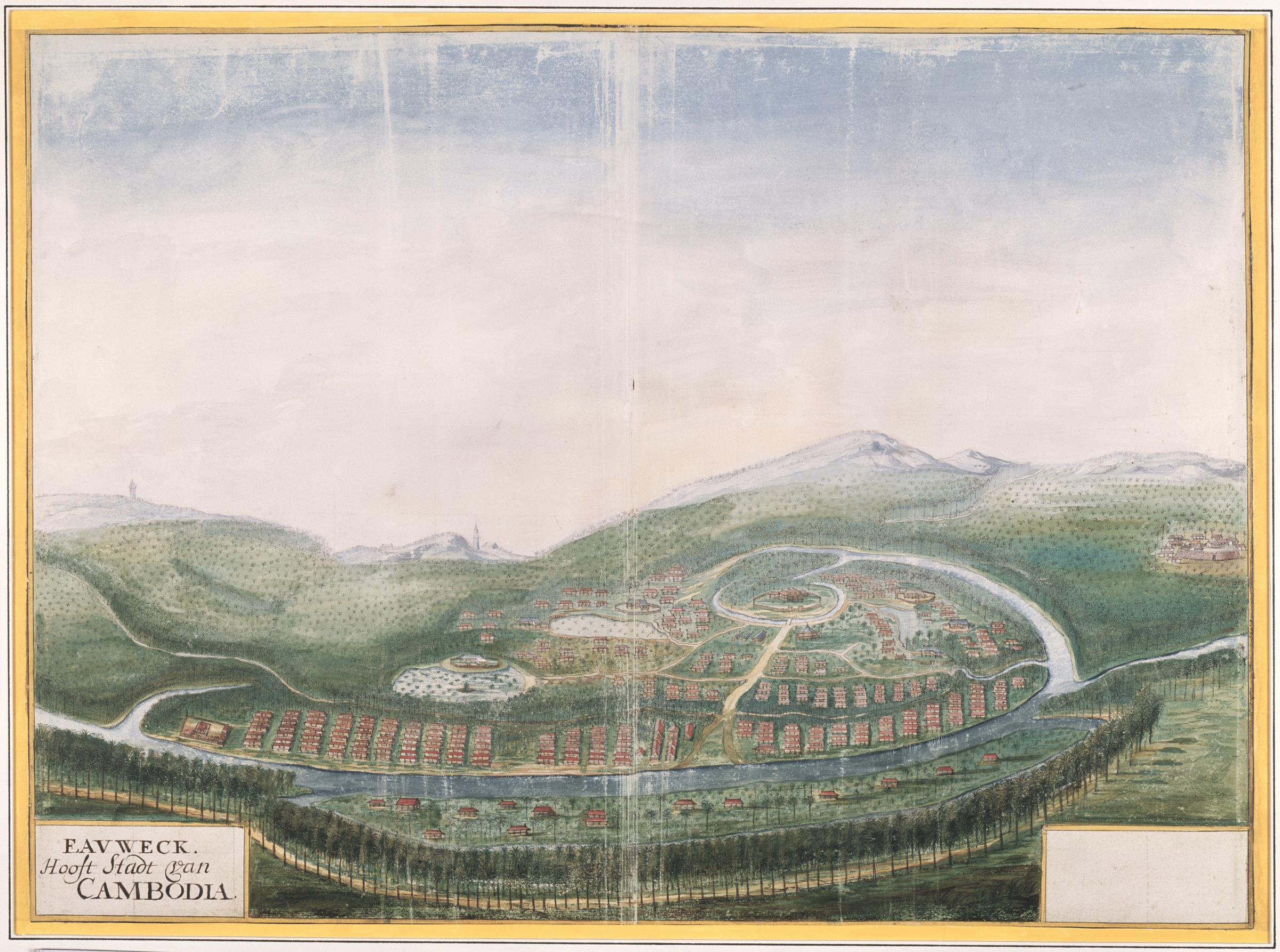
Bird's eye view of Longvek, Cambodia

King Ang Chan I (1516–1566) moved the capital from Phnom Penh north to Longvek at the banks of the Tonle Sap river. Trade was an essential feature and "...even though they appeared to have a secondary role in the Asian commercial sphere in the 16th century, the Cambodian ports did indeed thrive." Products traded there included precious stones, metals, silk, cotton, incense, ivory, lacquer, livestock (including elephants), and rhinoceros horn.

=== First contact with the West ===
Messengers of Portuguese admiral Alfonso de Albuquerque, conqueror of Malacca arrived in Indochina in 1511, the earliest documented official contact with European sailors. By the late 16th and early 17th centuries, Longvek maintained flourishing communities of Chinese, Indonesian, Malay, Japanese, Arab, Spanish, English, Dutch, and Portuguese traders.

Christian missionary activities began in 1555 with Portuguese clergyman friar Gaspar da Cruz, the first to set foot in the Kingdom of Cambodia, who "...wasn’t able to spread the word of God and he was seriously ill[sic]." Subsequent attempts did not yield any results that could substantiate a congregation.

In the second half of the 16th century, European writers called Cambodia one of the greatest powers in Southeast Asia behind Burma. Europeans additionally called Longvek one of the most glorious and richest cities in Southeast Asia. During the fall of Longvek, the last Longvek king sent letters to the Spanish governor of the colonial Philippines requesting aid to help defend against the Siamese forces of King Naresuan. Following its sack in 1594, the Spanish soon after managed to send a handful of detachments to help restore the last king's son on the throne of Longvek, but Longvek was totally devastated and destroyed by the Siamese.

=== Military resurgence and fall ===
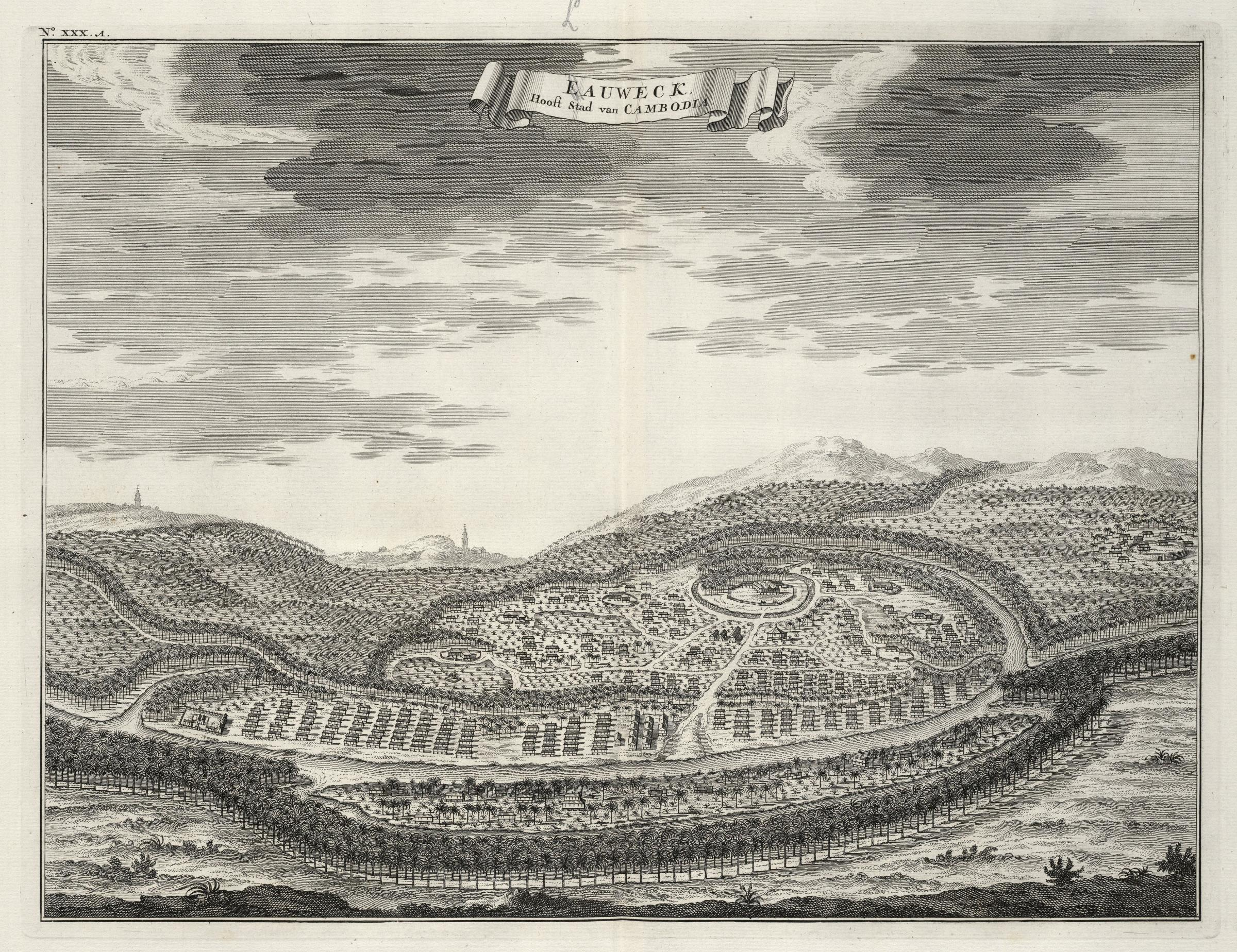
A drawing by Dutch mapmaker Johannes Vingboons, "Eauweck, hooftstadt van Cambodia - Longvek, capital of Cambodia"

Cambodia was a potent rival of the Ayutthaya Kingdom in the 16th century. Following the Burmese subjugation of Ayutthaya in 1569, Cambodia launched numerous military expeditions into a weakened Siam between the 1560s and the 1580s. In 1570, Cambodian forces besieged Ayutthaya, but were repulsed by fierce resistance and the rainy season floods. In 1581, Cambodia sacked the Siamese city of Phetchaburi and emptied the city of its inhabitants.

Meanwhile, in 1572 and 1573-1575, the king of Lan Xang sent two invasions to subjugate Longvek. Both invasions ended in complete failure and the Lan Xang king was assumed to have died in the conflict.

In retribution for multiple Longvek raids on Ayutthaya, in 1587, Cambodia was attacked by the Siamese Crown Prince Naresuan, who failed to besiege the city of Longvek. In 1594, Longvek was successfully captured and sacked by Siamese forces and Cambodian royals were taken hostage and relocated to the court of Ayutthaya.

The initially fortunate circumstances of some members of the Longvek royal family, managing to seek refuge at the Lao court of Vientiane, ended tragically. The refugees never returned to demand their claims. Their sons, born and raised in Lan Xang, were alienated and while "moderately" manipulated, engaged in local court politics with the exiled Cambodians in Ayutthaya and had the ruling vassal King Ram I, who was of lower birth, killed with the help of Spanish and Portuguese sailors.

Shortly after they were killed and defeated in the Cambodian–Spanish War, with foreign hands—Malays and Chams—involved. This pattern of royal indignity is noticeable in its continuity during the 17th, 18th and 19th centuries, the Vietnamese court in Hue joining in as yet another stage of royal drama. Royal contender's quarrels often prevented any chance of restoring an effective King of competitive authority for decades.

The fall of Longvek is well remembered in Cambodian history and is a major source of historical trauma of Cambodian civilization, in some ways far more vocal than the memories of the quieter abandonment of Angkor. The fall of Longvek is perhaps one reason why so little of Cambodian history is recorded from this era, as all the sources were destroyed or looted by the Siamese armies.

=== Spanish invasion of Cambodia ===
In the decades leading up to the Fall of Longvek, Spanish missionaries and traders began to arrive in Longvek. During the last Siamese invasion of Longvek, the last Longvek king sent letters requesting military aid to the Spanish military governor of the Philippines. The Spanish governor, sensing an opportunity to spread Christianity to Cambodia, sent an army to expel the Siamese from Longvek. In 1594, the Spanish army successfully kicked the Siamese out of Longvek but found the capital to be in ruins. The Spanish placed a puppet ruler on the throne, the son of the last king of Longvek, but by the end of the 1590s were totally expelled from Cambodia by local forces.

== Srey Santhor-Lvea Aem era ==
Kings Preah Ram I and Preah Ram II moved the capital several times and established their royal capitals at Tuol Basan (Srey Santhor) around 40 kilometres north-east of Phnom Penh, later Pursat, Lavear Em and finally Oudong. In 1596 Spanish and Portuguese conquistadores from Manila raided and razed Srei Santhor.

In 1618, King Chey Chettha II stopped sending tribute to Ayutthaya and reasserted Cambodian independence. A Siamese expedition in 1621-22 to reconquer Cambodia failed in dramatic fashion.

== Oudong era ==
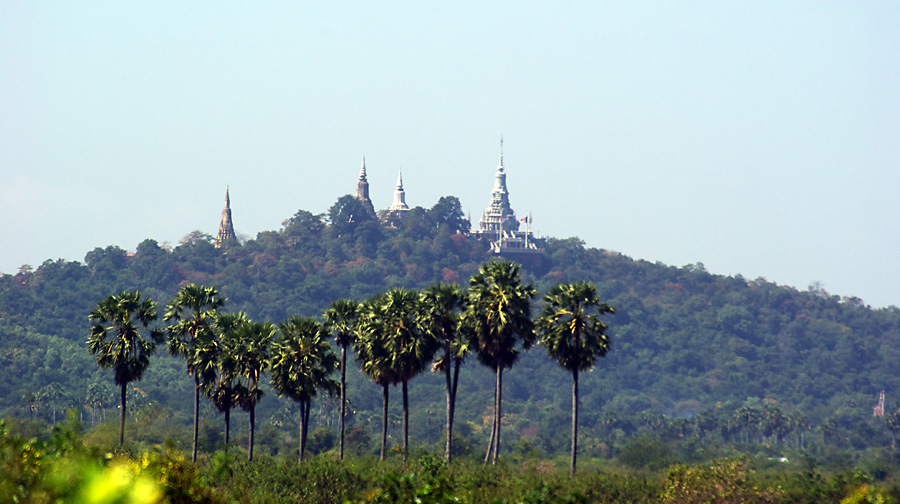
Phnom Oudong, the former capital of Cambodia.

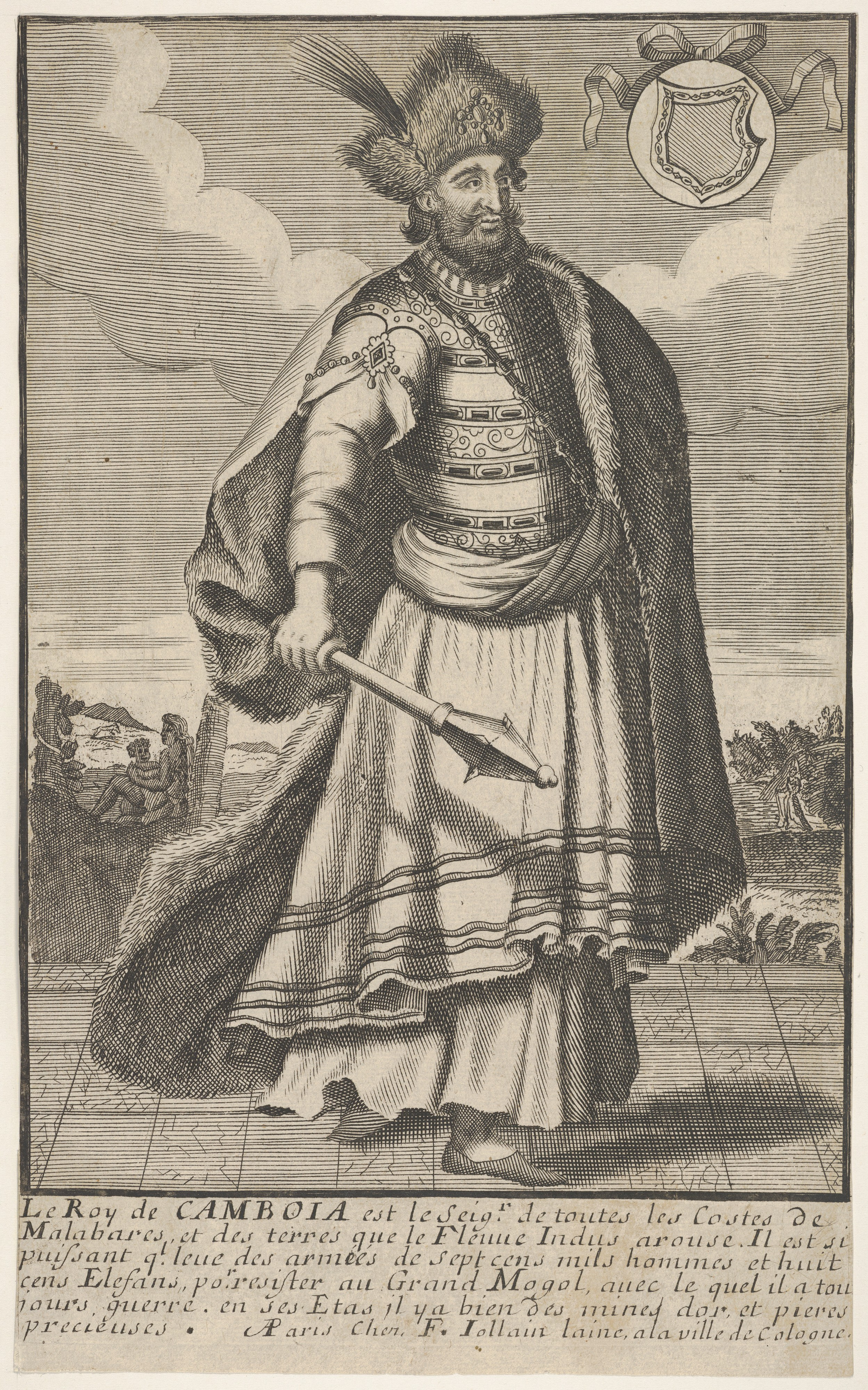
The King of Cambodia standing with a sceptre in his right hand

By the 17th and 18th centuries, Siam and Vietnam increasingly fought over control of the fertile Mekong basin, enhancing pressure on an unstable Cambodia. The 17th century was also the beginning of direct relations between post-Angkor Cambodia and Vietnam, that is the war between Nguyễn lords who ruled central and southern Vietnam and Trịnh lords in the north.

Henri Mouhot: "Travels in the Central Parts of Indo-China", 1864

"Udong, the present capital of Cambodia, is situated north-east of Komput, and is four miles and a half from that arm of the Mekon which forms the great lake...Every moment I met mandarins, either borne in litters or on foot, followed by a crowd of slaves carrying various articles; some, yellow or scarlet parasols, more or less large according to the rank of the person; others, boxes with betel. I also encountered horsemen, mounted on pretty, spirited little animals, richly caparisoned and covered with bells, ambling along, while a troop of attendants, covered with dust and sweltering with heat, ran after them. Light carts, drawn by a couple of small oxen, trotting along rapidly and noisily, were here and there to be seen. Occasionally a large elephant passed majestically by. On this side were numerous processions to the pagoda, marching to the sound of music; there, again, was a band of ecclesiastics in single file, seeking alms, draped in their yellow cloaks, and with the holy vessels on their backs....The entire population numbers about 12,000 souls."

However, Cambodia remained economically significant in the early part of the Oudong period. According to Yoneo Ishii, a Japanese Historian has demonstrated, Cambodia for much of 17th century was considered by the Japanese as a more important maritime commercial power than Ayutthaya, In particular, during the reign of Cambodia’s Muslim king.

=== Loss of the Mekong Delta ===
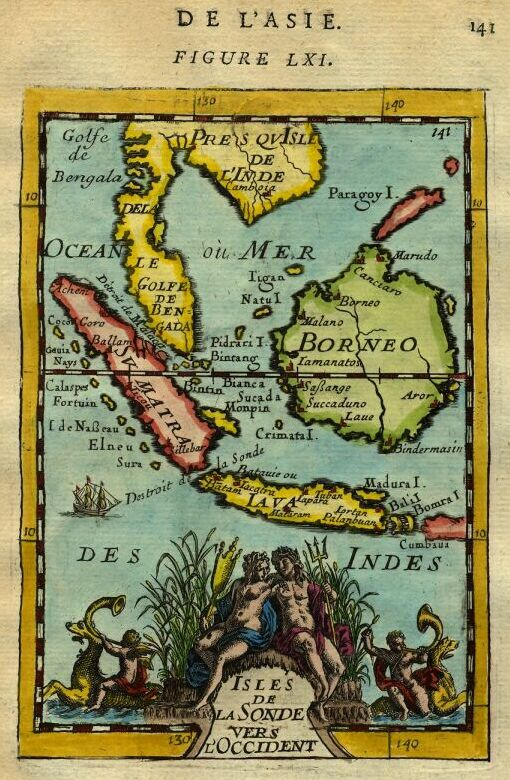
1683 map showing Cambodia

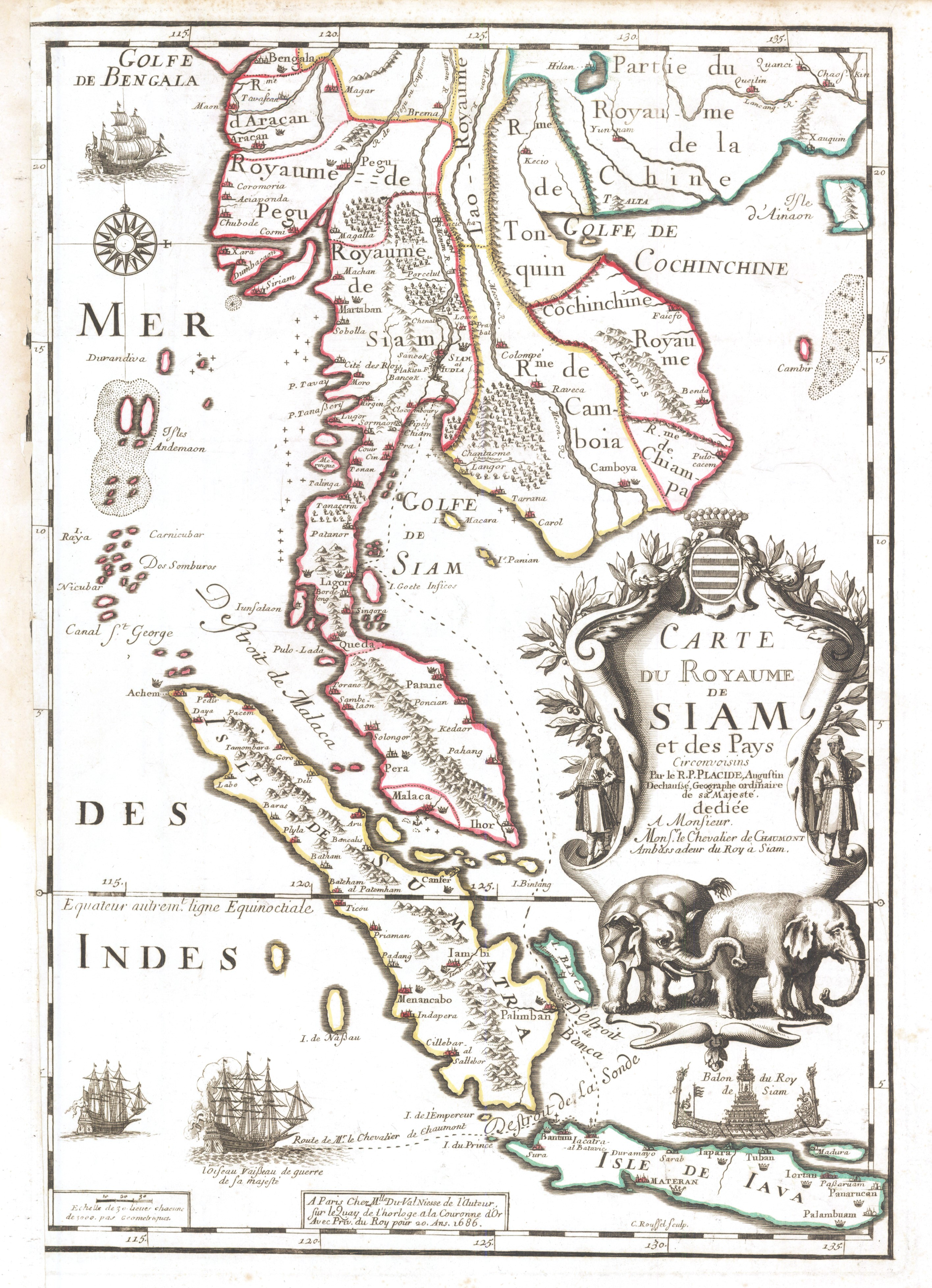
The Kingdom of Cambodia in 1686

By the late 15th century, the Vietnamese—descendants of the Sinic civilisation sphere—had conquered some of the territories of the principalities of Champa. Some of the surviving Chams began their diaspora in 1471, many re-settling in Khmer territory. However, the Cambodian Chronicle does not mention the Cham arrival in Cambodia until the 17th century. The last remaining principality of Champa, Panduranga, survived until 1832.

==== Traditional view ====
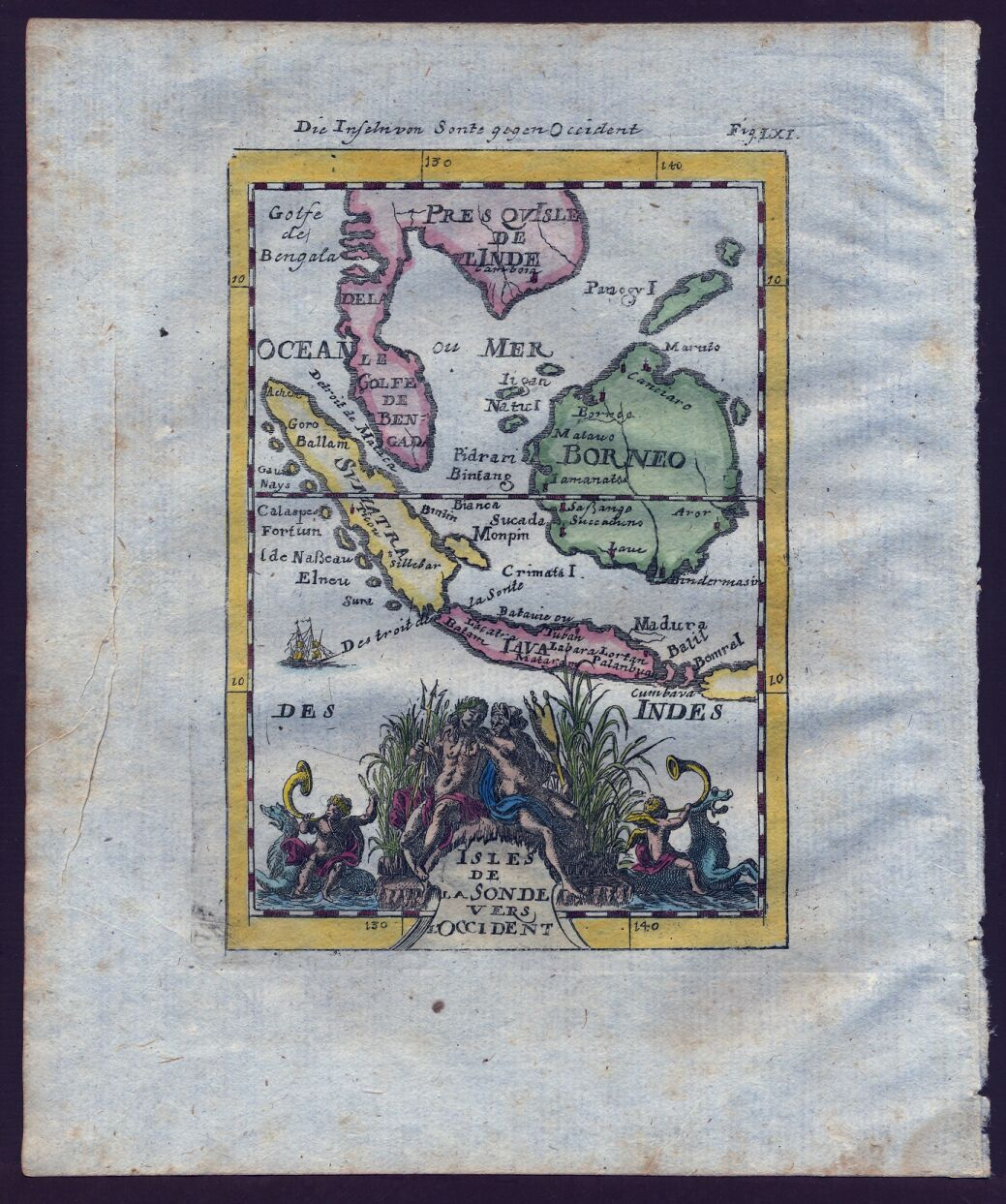
1719 map showing Cambodia

In 1620, the Vietnamese on their southwards expansion (Nam tiến) had reached the Mekong Delta, a hitherto Khmer domain. Also in 1620, the Khmer king Chey Chettha II (1618–28) married a daughter of lord Nguyễn Phúc Nguyên, one of the Nguyễn lords, who held sway over southern Vietnam for most of the Lê dynasty era from 1428 to 1788. Three years later, king Chey Chettha allowed Vietnam to establish a custom-post at Prey Nokor, modern day Ho Chi Minh City. Vietnam after gaining independence from the Chinese now instituted its own version of the frontier policies of the Chinese empire and by the end of the 17th century, the region was under full Vietnamese administrative control. Cambodia's access to international sea trade was now hampered by Vietnamese taxes and permissions.

==== Contrary views ====
The story of a Cambodian king falling in love with a Vietnamese princess, who requested and obtained Kampuchea Krom, the Mekong Delta for Vietnam is folklore, dismissed by scholars and not even mentioned in the Royal Chronicles.

In the process of re-interpretation of the royal records and their rather doubtful contents, Michael Vickery again postulates that future publications take these contradicting facts into account: "First, the very concept of a steady Vietnamese "Push to the South" (nam tiến) requires rethinking. It was not steady, and its stages show that there was no continuing policy of southward expansion. Each move was ad hoc, in response to particular challenges..."

Vickery additionally argues that Cambodia was never "cut off from maritime access to the outside world" in the 17th century, as argued by David Chandler.

=== Rise of minority factions in Cambodia ===
The late 16th and 17th centuries saw the increasing involvement of the minorities of Cambodia in Cambodian court politics and taking advantage of Cambodia's weakness by vassalizing Cambodian territory. The various groups involved in Cambodia at the time included the Spanish, Dutch, Portuguese, Cham, Malay, and Chinese, all of whom would play a destabilizing impact on Cambodian politics and diplomacy.

Between the 16th and 19th centuries increasing Chinese immigration from Southern China to Cambodia led to the creation of significant Chinese colonies all along the southern coast of Cambodia and the Gulf of Siam. In the 17th century one of these communities would form their own petty kingdom called Ha Tien, which essentially acted as an independent Chinese pirate state in all but name, in theory swearing fealty to Cambodia but in reality playing the Southeast Asian courts against each other. Ha Tien in the 17th and 18th centuries was one of the most richest independent Chinese polities in Southeast Asia. In the late 18th century, the Vietnamese would conquer Ha Tien and the Southeastern coastline of Cambodia became dominated by Vietnamese sovereignty. Pirates would in particular plague the Southern coastline of Cambodia in the 17th through 19th centuries.

In the 16th and 17th centuries Cambodia increasingly housed a prominent Muslim population, composed of Cham and Malay Muslims drawn to the Mekong River Delta. They formed local communities along the Mekong Delta. Following the Fall of Longvek, the Cambodian Muslims would play a big role in influencing the country, beginning with the expelling of the Spanish from Cambodia in the 1590s.

=== 17th century ===
In 1642, Cambodian prince Ponhea Chan became king after overthrowing and assassinating king Outey. Malay Muslim merchants in Cambodia helped him in his takeover, and he subsequently converted to Islam from Buddhism, changed his name to Ibrahim, married a Malay woman and reigned as Ramathipadi I.

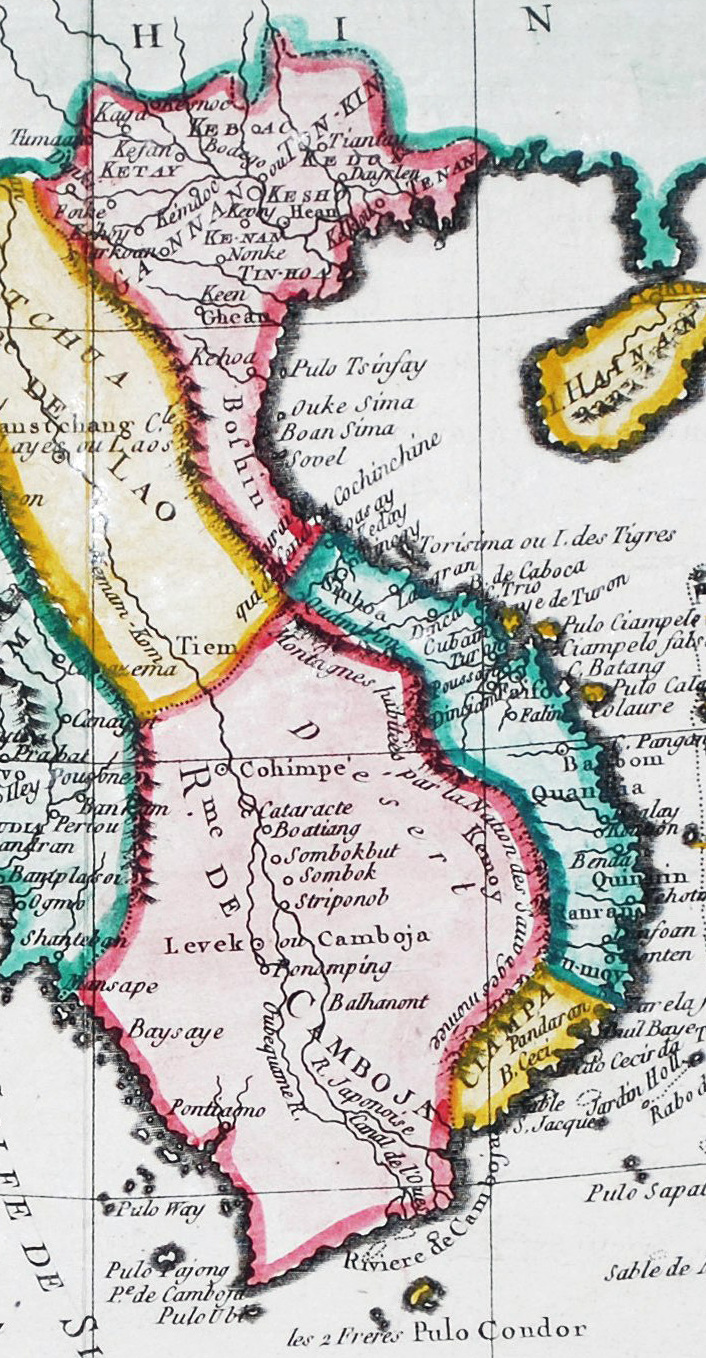
A 1770s map of Cambodia

Ramathipadi defeated the Dutch East India Company in naval engagements of the Cambodian–Dutch War during 1643 and 1644. Pierre de Rogemortes, the ambassador of the Company was killed alongside a third of his 432 men and it was not until two centuries later that Europeans played any important and influential role in Cambodian affairs. In the 1670s, the Dutch left all the trading posts they had maintained in Cambodia after the massacre in 1643. The first Vietnamese military intervention took place in 1658-59, in which rebel Cambodian princes, Ibrahim Ramathipadi's own brothers, had requested military support to depose the Muslim ruler and restore Buddhism.

Koxinga's son Zheng Jing sent a Chinese commander called Piauwja by the Dutch (Xian Biao 先彪 or Biaoye 彪爷 in Chinese) with hundreds of troops to Cambodia in February 1667 to the court of Cambodian King Paramaraja VIII. Piauwja received the title of Shahbandar of the Chinese community of Cambodia from the King. Piauwja massacred 1,000 Vietnamese men, women and children in Cambodia on behalf of the Cambodian king, who wanted to break free of Vietnamese influence. Piauwja also demanded that the Dutch pay him compensation for confiscating his ships in a naval blockade. Pieter Ketting, the Dutch East India Company's representative in Cambodia only offered to pay 1,000 taels to Piauwja when an advisor to the Cambodian King said he should pay 2,000 taels. Piauwja in response then demanded Ketting pay 6,000 taels, as compensation for a debt that another Chinese merchant working for the Dutch in Batavia owed him. Ketting refused and tried to bribe Cambodian officials to help him, but Piauwja forced Ketting to pay 4,837 taels by seizing Dutch hostages. The Schelvis, another Dutch ship arrived at Cambodian capital's shoreline on the river's mouth, but the river banks low water level rendered the range of the Dutch cannons on the ship useless. The Cambodians forbade fighting between Koxinga's forces and the Dutch on Cambodian waters, so Piaujwa instead attacked the Dutch East India company outpost on land on July 9–10, fatally wounding a Dutch surgeon and killing Ketting immediately along with 3 servants. Jacob van Wijckersloot only survived by escaping to the jungle and hiding for days before reaching the Schelvis and documenting what happened. On 28 October 1667, the Cambodian King sent a letter to the Dutch in Batavia apologising for the incident, and falsely claiming he executed Piauwja, and arrested three Dutch company employees who he said helped Piauwja against their fellow Dutch. He sent the three arrested Dutch back to Batavia, but Piauwja was in fact alive and was still working for Koxinga in the 1670s, raiding the Qing in Guangdong. Piauwja had also looted all the silk and silver on the Dutch ship Schelvisch before leaving. His name was also written as Pioja by the Dutch. Another account said Piauwja came with 3,000 Chinese troops at Oudong.

=== 18th and 19th centuries ===
Siam, which might otherwise have been courted as an ally against Vietnamese incursions in the 18th century, was itself involved in prolonged conflicts with Burma and in 1767 the Siamese capital of Ayutthaya was completely destroyed. However, Siam recovered and soon reasserted its dominion over Cambodia. The youthful Khmer king Ang Eng (1779–96) was installed as monarch at Oudong while Siam annexed Cambodia's Battambang and Siem Reap provinces. The local rulers became vassals under direct Siamese rule.

A renewed struggle between Siam and Vietnam for control of Cambodia and the Mekong basin in the early 19th century resulted in Vietnamese dominance over a Cambodian vassal king. Justin Corfield writes in "French Indochina": "[1807] the Vietnamese expanded their lands by establishing a protectorate over Cambodia. However king […] Ang Duong was keen on Cambodia becoming independent of [...] Thailand [...] and Vietnam [...] and sought help from the British in Singapore. When that failed, he enlisted the help of the French."

Siam and Vietnam had fundamentally different attitudes concerning their relationship with Cambodia. The Siamese shared a common religion, mythology, literature, and culture with the Khmer, having adopted many religious and cultural practices. The Thai Chakri kings followed the Chakravatin system of an ideal universal ruler, ethically and benevolently ruling over all his subjects. The Vietnamese enacted a civilising mission, as they viewed the Khmer people as culturally inferior and regarded the Khmer lands as legitimate site for colonisation by settlers from Vietnam. Attempts to force Cambodians to adopt Vietnamese customs caused several rebellions against Vietnamese rule. The most notable took place from 1840 to 1841, spreading through much of the country.

From the 18th century until French conquest, the kings of Cambodia were highly controlled puppets of the Siamese and Vietnamese monarchies. Beginning in the 1770s, it became the custom for the Cambodian royal family to send young princes as hostages to the Siamese court at Bangkok. Most of the Cambodian kings of the late 18th and early 20th century was a byproduct of this Bangkok pipeline, including Kings Norodom and Sisowath, the latter was the last Cambodian king to be educated in Bangkok.

The territory of the Mekong Delta became a territorial dispute between Cambodians and Vietnamese. Cambodia gradually lost control of the Mekong Delta. By the 1860s French colonist had taken over the Mekong Delta and establish the colony of French Cochinchina. Shortly after the French Protectorate over Cambodia, the capital was moved to Phnom Penh in 1866, marking the final end of the Oudong era.

==== Nguyen rule ====
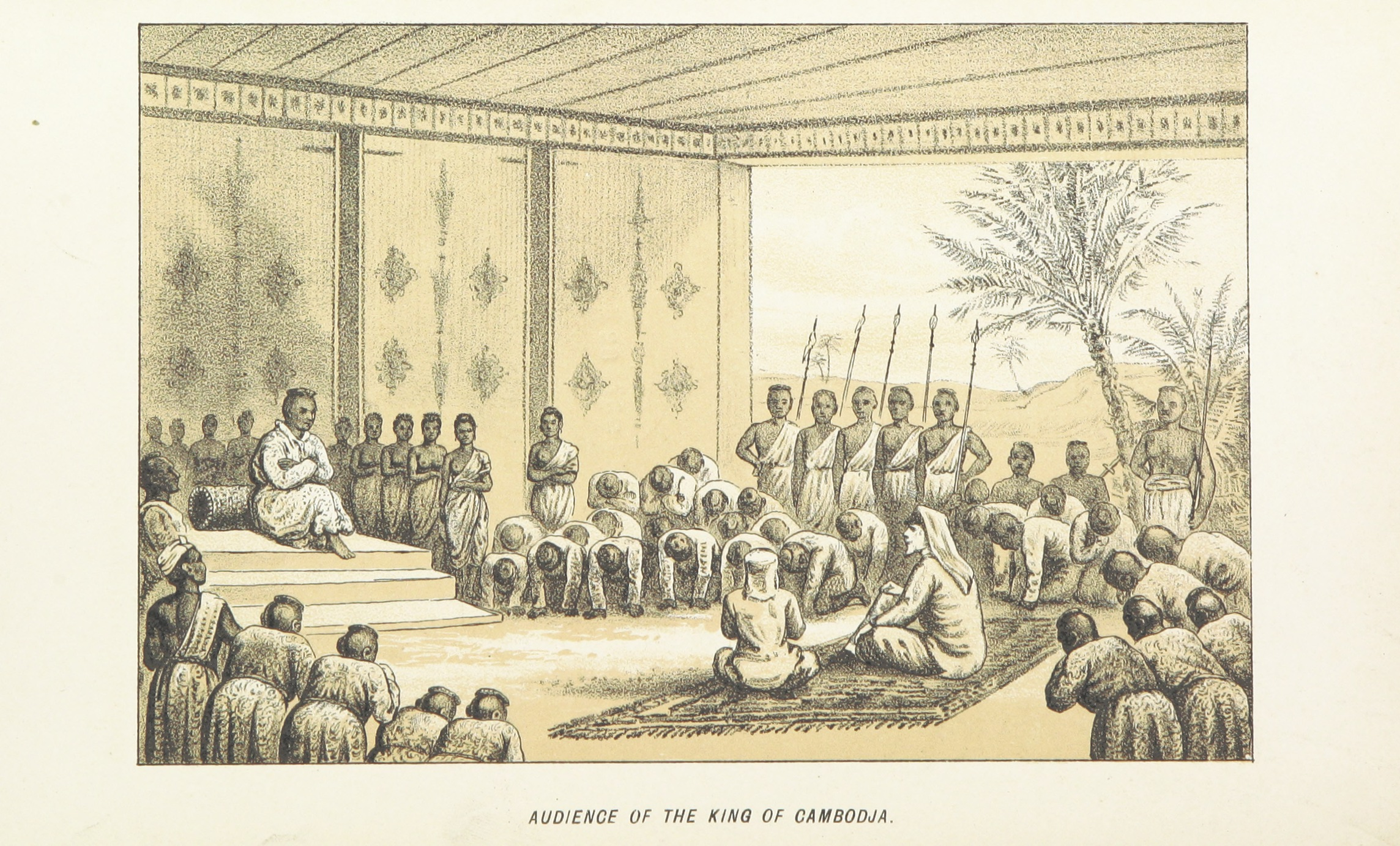
King Ang Duong receiving Ludvig Verner Helms in 1851. The sketch was published by Helms in Pioneering in the Far East (1882).

As the Vietnamese empire consolidated itself over the eastern mainland under Gia Long and Minh Mang, Cambodia fell to the Vietnamese invasion in 1811. The invasion was initiated by the ruling king, King Ang Chan II's (r. 1806–35) request to Gia Long to suppress his own brothers, Ang Snguon and Ang Em, who were in rebellion against him. The two brothers fled to Thailand, while Ang Chan became a Vietnamese vassal.

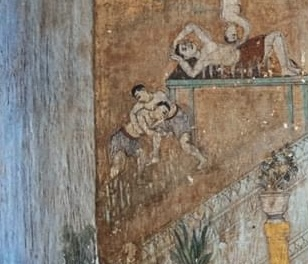
Wall painting in the interior of the vihara (pagoda) at Wat Kampong Tralach Loeu (វត្តកំពង់ត្រឡាចលើ) in Kampong Chhnang Province, Cambodia

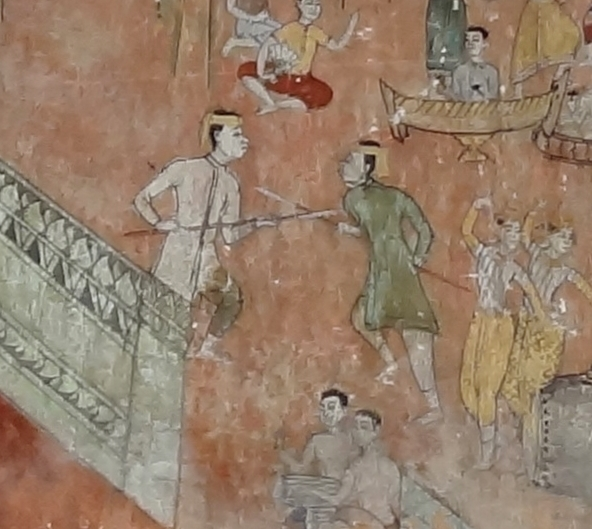
Kampong Tralach Fighting

In 1820 Gia Long died and his fourth son Minh Mang inherited the throne. Both Minh Mang and his father were strong adherents of Confucianism, but Minh Mang was a sadistic isolationist and strong ruler. He removed the Viceroy of Cambodia and Saigon in 1832, triggered the pro-Catholic Lê Văn Khôi revolt against him in 1833. The Thai army, intended to support the rebellion, launched an offensive campaign against the Vietnamese on occupying Cambodia. This led Ang Chan to flee to Saigon, as Rama III promised to restore the Kingdom of Cambodia and punish the insolence of the Kingdom of Vietnam. In 1834, the rebellion in Southern Vietnam was suppressed, and Minh Mang ordered troops to launch the second invasion of Cambodia. This drove most of the Thai forces to the west and reinstalled Ang Chan as the puppet king in Phnom Penh, later succeeded by his daughter, Queen Ang Mey (r. 1835–41). Later that year, the Tây Thành Province was established, the Vietnamese occupied Cambodia result in direct Vietnamese control. For the next six years, the Vietnamese emperor had tried to force the Cambodians to adopt Vietnamese culture by cultural assimilation, a progress that historian David P. Chandler called The Vietnamization of Cambodia.

The death of Minh Mang in early 1841 halted the Vietnamization of Cambodia. With 35,000 Thai troops, they took advantage of the dire situation in Vietnam, rushed into the Tây Thành Province, and were able to fend off Vietnamese counteroffensives in late 1845. The new Vietnamese emperor, Thieu Tri, readied to make peace with Siam, and in June 1847 a peace treaty was signed. The Kingdom of Cambodia under Ang Duong regained its independence after 36 years of brutal Vietnamese occupations and Siamese interventions.

== Consequences and conclusions ==
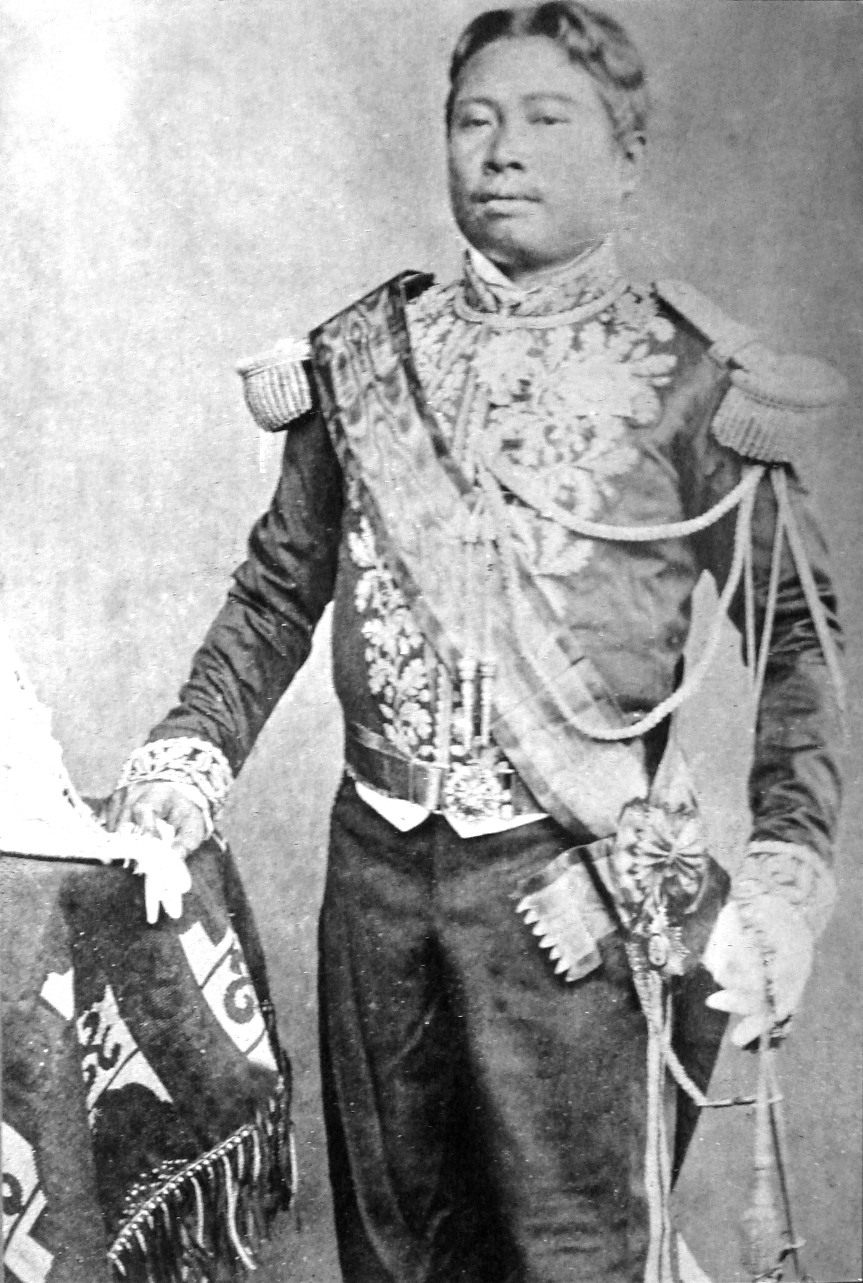
King Norodom of Cambodia

=== European colonialism and Anglo-French rivalries ===
Admiral Léonard Charner proclaimed the formal annexation of three provinces of Cochinchina into the French Empire on 31 July 1861, the beginning of the colonial era of France in South-East Asia. France's interference in Indochina was thus a fact and the colonial community pressing to establish a commercial network in the region based on the Mekong river, ideally linking up with the gigantic market of southern China.

Dutch author H.Th. Bussemaker has argued that these French colonial undertakings and acquisitions in the region were mere reactions to or counter-measures against British geo-strategy and economic hegemony. "For the British, it was obvious that the French were trying to undercut British expansionism in India and China by interposing themselves in Indochina. The reason for this frantic expansionism was the hope that the Mekong river would prove to be navigable to the Chinese frontier, which then would open the immense Chinese market for French industrial goods." To save the kingdom's national identity and integrity, King Ang Duong initiated secret negotiations in a letter to Napoleon III seeking to obtain some agreement of protection with France.

In June 1884, the French governor of Cochinchina, Charles Thomson went to Phnom Penh, Norodom's capital, and demanded approval of a treaty with Paris that promised far-reaching changes such as the abolition of slavery, the institution of private land ownership, and the establishment of French résidents in provincial cities. The king reluctantly signed the agreement. The Philaster Treaty of 1874 confirmed French sovereignty over the whole of Cochin China and on 16 November 1887 the Indo-Chinese Union was established.

=== Continued debate over Post-Angkor historiography ===
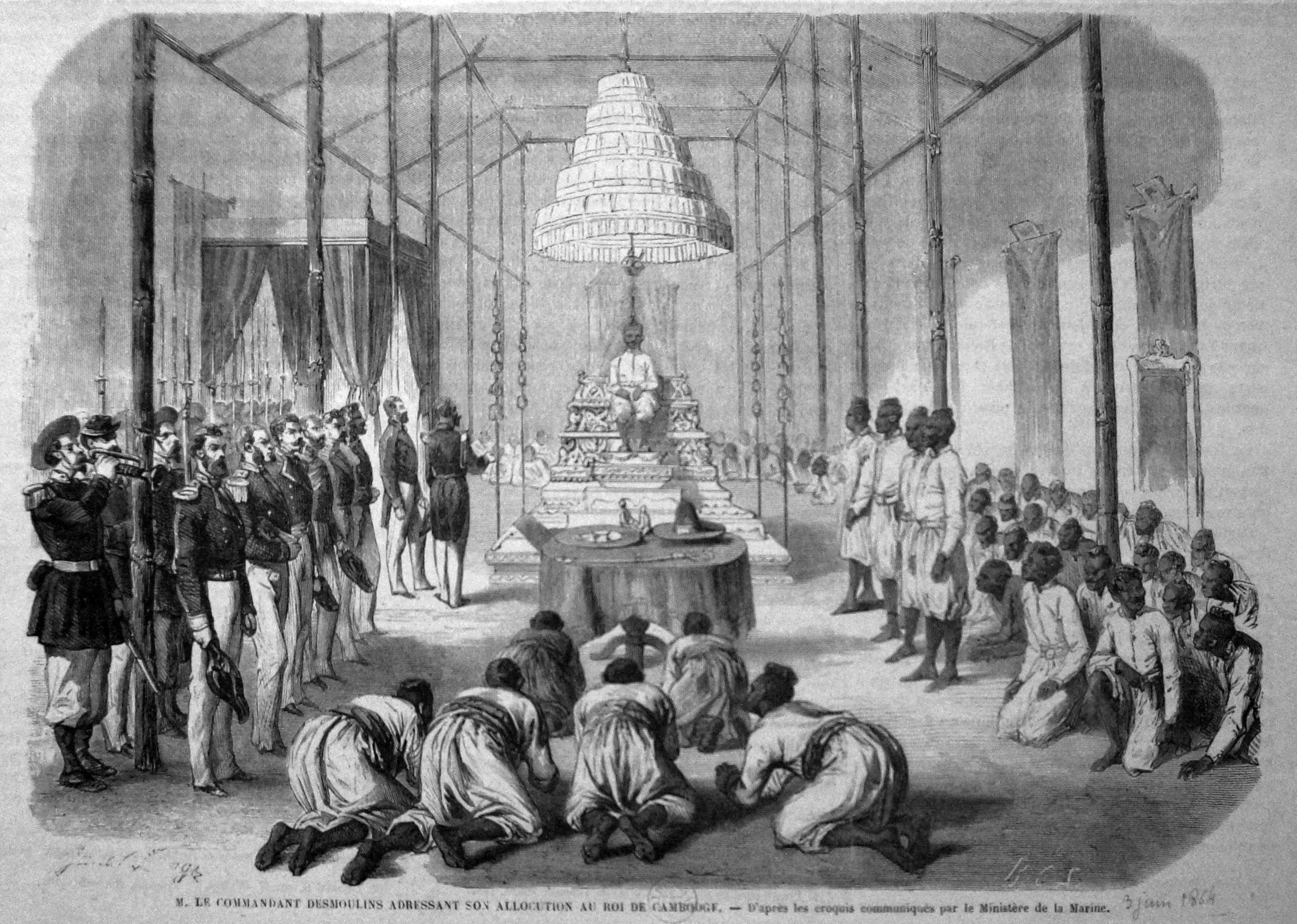
Coronation of Norodom, 3 June 1864.

Archaeology of Cambodia is considered to be still in its infancy. The introduction of new methods of geochronology such as LIDAR-Scanning and Luminescence dating has revealed new sets and kinds of data and studies on climate—and environmental imbalances have become more numerous in recent years. Reflection of results obviously requires time, as in an article of the US National Academy of Sciences of the year 2010, the author complains: "Historians and archaeologists have, with a few notable exceptions only rarely considered the role played by environment and climate in the history of Angkor".

Widely debated remain historiography, culturalism and other aspects of the historical sources as wide contradictions suggest. Probably the greatest challenge is to synchronise all research with the conclusions of the neighbouring countries. Delicate issues exist that are rooted in this historical period (border disputes, cultural heritage), which are politically relevant and far from solved. Definitive conclusions with all contributing factors in a reasonable context are clearly future events.

Miriam T. Stark in: "From Funan to Angkor Collapse and Regeneration in Ancient Cambodia"

"...explaining why particular continuities and discontinuities characterise ancient Cambodia remains impossible without a more finely textured understanding of the archaeological record... Future work, that combines systematic archaeological research and critical documentary analysis can and should illuminate aspects of resilience and change..."

== See also ==
- Buddhism in Cambodia
- Cambodian Royal Chronicles
- History of Cambodia
- Khmer Empire
- French Protectorate of Cambodia
- List of monarchs of Cambodia
- Monarchs' family tree
- Devaraja
- Mainland Southeast Asia
