= Ramathipadi I =

King of Cambodia

Ramathipadi I រាមាធិបតីទី១ Sultan Ibrahim سلطان إبراهيم

Sultan of Cambodia
- Reign: 1642–1658
- Predecessor: Batom Reachea (Ang Non I)
- Successor: Barom Reachea V
- Born: 1614
- Died: 1659 (aged 44–45)
- Spouse: Neak Moneang Kapah Pau (a Malay)
- Issue: Princess Dav Kshatriyi
Names
- Ramathipadi I Sultan Ibrahim
- House: House of Trasak Paem
- Father: Chey Chettha II
- Mother: Neak Moneang Pussa (from Lan Xang)
- Religion: Theravada Buddhism (until 1642); Sunni Islam (from 1642)

Ramathipadi I (Khmer: រាមាធិបតីទី១; 1614 – 1659), also known as Ponhea Chan (Khmer: ពញាចន្ទ pronounced [pʰɲiə.cɑn]), Cau Bana Cand, Botum Reachea I, Nac Cham, or Sultan Ibrahim (Jawi: سلطان إبراهيم), reigning from 1642 to 1658, was the first and only Cambodian king to convert to Islam. Ramathipadi I was the third son of Chey Chettha II.

== Biography ==
=== Accession to the throne and conversion ===
After the death of King Ang Tong Reachea in 1640, his uncle Barom Reachea placed his own son on the throne as Batum Reachea I (Ang Non). The regicide was well planned. Sitttha first secured the loyalty of the Khmer nobility, as well as the leaders of the local Japanese, Malay and Portuguese communities from which he hired a hitman to carry out the crime.

"On the appointed day, in the evening of January 5, 1642, while Paramaraja was playing his customary game of cards with some of his nobles, the chamberlain approached him from behind and stabbed him to death with a Japanese dagger he had hidden under his clothes."

With the help of Muslim merchants from Malaya, and the support of Vietnamese queen Ngoc Van, Ponhea Chan murdered his cousin Ang Non I as well as his uncle Barom Reachea in 1642, and ascended the throne as Botum Reachea I.

He converted to Islam. Ramathipadi I was strongly influenced by the life and practise of Muslim Malay merchants. During his reign, Phnom Penh was still a place of considerable profit: merchants came from all over the region, Japanese Christians found refuge in Cambodia as well as Chinese, swelled by the arrival of Ming loyalists after the dynasty's fall in 1644, who formed the largest foreign community in Cambodia. In the 1630s, the Dutch East India Company established a post in Phnom Penh, mainly for the purchase of deerskins; the governor general at the time was Anthony van Diemen. However, tensions rose among groups representing various interests: Dutch, Portuguese, and Malays. Ramathipadi planned to drive out the Dutch East India Company. In 1643, the Cambodian–Dutch War broke out. The representatives the Dutch East India Company were massacred and the remainder imprisoned, according to Dutch sources, at the instigation of the rival Portuguese.

=== Popular resentment ===
However, most Cambodians were Buddhist and wanted to overthrow him, and sought help from Vietnamese Nguyễn lords. In 1658, King Narai of Siam prepared to invade Cambodia from the West, encouraging Ang So to lead a rebellion from the East against Ramathipadi I.

In 1658, a Vietnamese army invaded Cambodia, deposed him, and imprisoned him in Quảng Bình. He died in the next year, probably killed by Vietnamese or died of disease.

=== Aftermath ===
After his assassination, Chan's three sons took refuge in Siam. The following years were marked by almost unceasing conflict as court politics were factionalized between those linked to Ayutthaya and those who were pro-Vietnamese, while hopes of stability were further undermined by another Nguyen invasion in 1673.

== Politics ==
=== The growing influence of Vietnam on Cambodia ===
During the reign of Ramathipadi I, the Vietnamese influence grew even greater over the political life of Cambodia and became another factor of instability. Nguyễn Phúc Ngọc Vạn, a consort of his father, who had supported his ascension to the throne at an early stage, preserved her position as "queen mother" with her own palace and court. She continued to deflect tentative Khmer efforts to regain Prei Nokor, and Kampong Krabei. She also protected the two surviving sons of Barom Reachea, Ang So and Ang Tan. Vietnamese merchants became more active in Cambodia at this time, particularly buying rice needed to supply the heavily militarized population among the walls on their northern frontier.

=== War with the Dutch ===
Sultan Ibrahim "launched what would become a 10-year war on Duch East Indies Company trading interests in Cambodia". Having drawn support from the Portuguese for his palace coup, King Ramadhipati was even less inclined than his predecessors to favor the Dutch over the Portuguese in matters of trade. This greatly annoyed the representative of the Duch East Indies Company, Pieter van Regemortes, who persisted in his attempts to dissuade the new king from his anti-Dutch stance, with the inevitable result that relations between the two men deteriorated. In November 1642, the new king threatened Van Regemortes to have him “trampled to death by elephants", encouraging the latter to find refuge in Batavia. In fear for his life, Van Regemortes fled to Batavia. In November 27, 1643, after Van Regemortes had returned to Cambodia with the title of Ambassador of the Company, he required compensation for the loss incurred. Offended by his arrogant tone, the King had him and 36 of his men assassinated on their way to the Palace. In retaliation, the Company sent a fleet of 432 men on 5 ships which arrived on the Mekong on June 3, 1644.

== Legacy ==
In present-day Cambodia, Ramathipadi I is an important figure for the Cham community in Cambodia, as he suggests a long relationship between Cham and Khmer, although many people are not aware of it.

== Historiography ==
The life of Ramathipadi I is primarily known through three different contemporary sources: Royal Chronicles of Cambodia, diaries of Dutch merchants, and reports of French missionaries.

Royal Chronicles of Cambodia from 1594 to 1677 were edited and published by Mak Phoeun in 1981 with the support of the Ecole française d'Extrême-Orient, but historians such as Michael Vickery or Sok Khin have criticized their accuracy. The Cambodian Royal Chronicles "denounces the country's Muslim monarch, the only one in Cambodian history, for giving Islamic Cham and Malay mandarins more power than the Khmer" fearing "the Khmer nation will disappear".

There are also Dutch sources, all based on reports by Dutch East Indies Company officials, describing the "strange events" that took place in Cambodia between 1635 and 1644, at the time of Ramathipadi's accession to the throne. These Dutch sources have a gap concerning Cambodia caused by the temporary abandoning of trade with Cambodia following the 1643 massacre and failed punitive expedition of 1644, after which the Dutch East Indies Company restored its counter under the direction of Hendrick Indijck.

French missionaries mentioned Ramathipadi I and his conversion to Islam in their reports own from 1682 to 1685.

== Bibliography ==
- Kiernan, Ben (2008). Blood and Soil: A World History of Genocide and Extermination from Sparta to Darfur. Melbourne Univ. Publishing. ISBN 978-0522854770.
- Trần Trọng Kim (2005). Việt Nam sử lược (in Vietnamese). Ho Chi Minh City: Ho Chi Minh City General Publishing House.

Ramathipadi I Varman Dynasty Born: 1614 Died: 1659
Regnal titles
Preceded by Batom Reachea	King of Cambodia; 1642–1658	Succeeded by Barom Reachea V
