= Monarchy of Cambodia =

King of Cambodia
- ព្រះមហាក្សត្រនៃកម្ពុជា
- Royal Standard

Incumbent
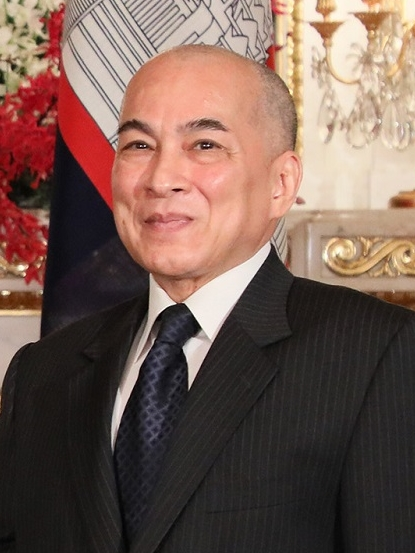
- Norodom Sihamoni since 29 October 2004

Details
- Style: His Majesty
- First monarch: Queen Soma
- Formed: 68 CE; 1,957–1,958 years ago
- Abolished: 9 October 1970 – 24 September 1993
- Residences: Khemarin Palace (official); Royal Residence (secondary)
- Appointer: Royal Council of the Throne
- Website: norodomsihamoni.org

The monarchy of Cambodia is the constitutional monarchy of the Kingdom of Cambodia. The king of Cambodia (Khmer: ព្រះមហាក្សត្រកម្ពុជា) is the head of state and head of the ruling Royal House of Norodom. In the contemporary period, the king's power has been limited to that of a symbolic figurehead. The monarchy had been in existence since at least 50 AD except during its abolition from 1970 to 1993. Since 1993, the king of Cambodia has been an elected monarch, making Cambodia one of the few elective monarchies of the world. The king is elected for life by the Royal Council of the Throne, which consists of several senior political and religious figures. Candidates are chosen from among male descendants of King Ang Duong who are at least 30 years old, from the two royal houses of Cambodia (the House of Norodom and the House of Sisowath).

== Role ==
Cambodia's constitution, promulgated in 1993, stipulates the king's role as a mainly ceremonial one. It declares that the king "shall reign, but not govern" as well as being the "symbol of national unity and continuity".

The king performs important functions of state as required by the constitution. These include but are not limited to:

- Appointing the prime minister and the Cabinet.
- Convening over the opening of the two legislative bodies, the National Assembly of Cambodia and the Senate of Cambodia.
- Serving as the supreme commander of the Royal Cambodian Armed Forces.
- Presiding over the Supreme Council of the National Defense.
- Meeting with the prime minister on a semi-monthly basis in which the king is briefed on matters of state.
- Signing the royal code/decree that gives effect to laws enacted by the legislature and proposals by the cabinet.
- Acting as "supreme arbiter" to enable the functioning of state institutions.
- Receiving credentials from ambassadors.
- Possessing the power of commutation and pardon.
- Presiding over the Supreme Council of the Magistracy.
- Appointing a fixed number of members to serve on state institutions such as the Senate and the Constitutional Council.
- Awarding of national honours.

The king also fulfils other roles not explicitly mentioned in the constitution in his capacity as head of state, for example, presiding over events of national significance including religious ceremonies and traditions integral to the Khmer nation, supporting humanitarian and philanthropic causes, and representing Cambodia abroad when undertaking official visits overseas. Although there have been female rulers in the past, the 1993 constitution currently forbids women from succeeding to the throne.

== Ministry of the Royal Palace ==
The Ministry of the Royal Palace, currently overseen by Minister Kuy Sophal in conjunction with the Supreme Privy Advisory Council, formerly headed by the King's half-brother Prince Norodom Ranariddh and now headed by former Prime Minister Hun Sen assists and advises the king accordingly in carrying out his duties as monarch.

== Mythological history ==
- Sage Kambu Swayambhuva

== Ancient period (68–1431) ==
=== Funan (68–627) ===
Order	Monarch	Name in foreign texts	Reign
1	Soma (♀)	Chinese: 柳葉; pinyin: Liǔyè (traditional Khmer: Neang Neak)	68 – later 1st century
2	Kaundinya I	Chinese: 混填; pinyin: Hùntián (traditional Khmer: Preah Tong)	later 1st century
3	Native name unknown	Chinese: 盤況; pinyin: Pán Kuàng	later 2nd century – 198
4	Native name unknown	Chinese: 盤盤; pinyin: Hun Pan-pan	198–201
5	Śrīmāraña	Fan Shiman	201–225
6	Native name unknown	Fan Jinsheng	225
7	Native name unknown	Fan Zhan	225–244
8	Native name unknown	Fan Chang	244
9	Native name unknown	Fan Xun	244–289
Unknown rulers: 289–c.357
10	Candana	Tiānzhú Zhāntán	c.357
Unknown rulers: c.357–410
11	Kaundinya II	Qiáochénrú	410–434
12	Srindravarman	Chílítuóbámó	434–435
Unknown rulers: 435–484
13	Jayavarman Kaundinya	Shéyébámó	484–514
14	Kulaprabhavati (♀)	Chinese name unknown	514–517
15	Rudravarman	Liútuóbámó	514–550
Unknown rulers: 550–627

=== Chenla (550–802) ===
Order	Monarch	Personal name	Reign
1	Srutavarman	Srutavarman	550–555
2	Sreshthavarman	Sreshthavarman	555–560
3	Vīravarman	Viravarman	560–575
4	Kambuja-raja-lakshmi (♀)	Kambujarajalakshmi	575–580
5	Bhavavarman I	Bhavavarman	580–600
6	Mahendravarman	Chet Sen	600–616
7	Isanavarman I	Isanavarman	616–635
8	Bhavavarman II	Bhavavarman	639–657
9	Jayavarman I	Jayavarman	657–681
10	Jayadevi (♀)	Jayadevi	c.681–713
Female successors of Sambhupura
11	Indrani (♀)	Indrani	c.713–760
12	Nṛpatendradevī (♀)	Nrpatendradevi	c.760–780
13	Jayendrabhā (♀)	Jayendrabha	c.780–802
14	Jyeṣṭhāryā (♀)	Jyestharya	c.802–803
Male successors of Water Chenla
11	Pushkaraksha	Pushkaraksha	c.713–730
12	Shambhuvarman	Shambhuvarman	c.730–760
13	Rajendravarman I	Rajendravarman	c.760–770
14	Mahipativarman	Mahipativarman	c.770–780
15	Jayavarman II	Jayavarman	c.780–802

=== Khmer Empire (802–1431) ===
Order	Monarch	Personal name	Reign
1	Jayavarman II	Jayavarman	802–850
2	Jayavarman III	Jayavarthon	850–877
3	Indravarman I	Indravarman	877–889
4	Yasovarman I	Yasovarthon	889–910
5	Harshavarman I	Harshavarman	910–923
6	Ishanavarman II	Isanavarman	923–928
7	Jayavarman IV	Jayavarman	928–941
8	Harshavarman II	Harshavarman	941–944
9	Rajendravarman II	Rajedravarman	944–968
10	Jayavarman V	Jayavarman	968–1001
11	Udayadityavarman I	Udayadityavarman	1001–1002
12	Jayavirahvarman	Jayavirahvarman	1002–1006
13	Suryavarman I	Suryavarman	1006–1050
14	Udayadityavarman II	Udayadityavarman	1050–1066
15	Harshavarman III	Harshavarman	1066–1080
16	Nripatindravarman	Nripatindravarman	1080–1113
17	Jayavarman VI	Jayavarman	1080–1107
18	Dharanindravarman I	Dharanindravarman	1107–1113
19	Suryavarman II	Suryavarman	1113–1150
20	Dharanindravarman II	Dharanindravarman	1150–1156
21	Yasovarman II	Yasovarman	1156–1165
22	Tribhuvanadityavarman	Tribhuvanadityavarman	1165–1177
Cham invasion by Jaya Indravarman: 1177–1181
23	Jayavarman VII	Jayavarthon	1181–1218
24	Indravarman II	Indrakumara	1218–1243
The first major Thai kingdom was created in Sukhothai, an area formerly ruled by Lavo in vassalage to Angkor: 1238
25	Jayavarman VIII	Jayavarman	1243–1295
26	Indravarman III	Srei Indravama	1295–1308
27	Indrajayavarman	Srei Jayavama	1308–1327
28	Jayavarman IX	Jayavama Borommesvarah	1327–1336
29	Śri Suriyobandhu I (Trasak Paem)	Ponhea Chey	1336–1340
30	Parama Nibbanpada (Nippean Bat)	Ponhea Kreak	1340–1346
31	Siddhanaraja (Sithean Reachea)	Sidhanta Raja	1346–1347
32	Lambamsaraja (Lompong Reachea)	Trasak Peam	1347–1352
Occupation by Uthong of Ayutthaya: 1352–1357
33	Suryavamśa (Soryavong)	Soryavong	1357–1363
34	Parama Ramadhipati (Barom Reameathibtei)	Damkhat	1363–1373
35	Dhammaśoka (Thomma Saok)	Kaeo Fa	1373–1393
Occupation by Ramesuan of Ayutthaya: 1393–1394 (5 months)
36	Paramaraja I (Borom Reachea I)	Ponhea Yat	1394–1431
Ayutthaya invasion and fall of Angkor: 1431

== Middle period (1431–1863) ==
=== Chaktomuk era (1431–1525) ===
Name	Portrait	Personal Name	Reign
Paramaraja I (Borom Reachea I) បរមរាជាទី២		Ponhea Yat ពញាយ៉ាត	1431–1463
Narayanaraja I (Noreay Reameathiptei) នរាយ រាមាធិបតី		Narayanaraja នរាយណ៍រាជាទី១ទ	1463–1469
Rama Rajadhipati (Srei Reachea) រាជា រាមាធិបតី		Sri Raja ស្រីរាជា	1469–1475
Śri Suriyodaya (Srei Soriyotei) ស្រីសុរិយោទ័យទី២		Rajadhiraja	1472–1475
Dhammaraja I (Thommo Reachea I) ធម្មោ រាជា ទី១		Dhammarajadhiraja	1476–1504
Śri Sugandhara I (Srei Sukonthor) ស្រីសុគន្ធធោ		Damkhat Sukonthor	1504–1512

=== Longvek era (1525–1594) ===
Name	Portrait	Personal Name	Reign
Śri Jettha (Srei Chettha) ស្រីជេដ្ឋា		Sdach Korn ស្ដេចកន	1512–1521
Civil war: Srei Chettha and Chan Reachea war: 1516–1525
Chandaraja (Chan Reachea) ចន្ទរាជា		Ponhea Chan ពញាចន្ទ	1516–1566
Paramindaraja (Baraminreachea) បរមរាជាទី១		Satha Mahindharaja	1566–1576
Sattha I (Satha I) សត្ថាទី១		Barom Reachea IV បរមរាជា	1576–1584
Jayajettha I (Chey Chettha I) ជ័យជេដ្ឋាទី១		Chey Chettha ជ័យជេដ្ឋា	1584–1594
Ayutthaya invasion and fall of Longvek: 1591–1594

=== Srei Santhor era (1594–1620) ===
Name	Portrait	Personal Name	Reign
Rama I (Preah Ram I) ព្រះរាម ទី១		Reamea Cheung Prey រាមាជើងព្រៃ	1594–1596
Rama II (Preah Ram II) ព្រះរាម ទី២		Keo Ban On	1596–1597
Paramaraja II (Barom Reachea II) បរមរាជា ទី២		Ponhea Ton ពញាតន់	1597–1599
Paramaraja III (Barom Reachea III) បរមរាជា ទី៣		Ponhea An ពញាអន	1599–1600
Kaev Hua I កែវហ៊្វាទី១		Ponhea Nhom ពញាញោម	1600–1603
Paramaraja IV (Barom Reachea IV) បរមរាជា ទី៤		Srei Soriyopor ស្រីសុរិយោពណ៌	1603–1618

=== Oudong era (1620–1863) ===
Name	Portrait	Personal Name	Reign	Relationship to predecessor
Jayajettha II (Chey Chettha II) ជ័យជេដ្ឋាទី២			1618–1628	Son
Dhammaraja II (Thommo Reachea II) ស្រីធម្មរាជាទី២		Ponhea To ពញាតូ	1628–1631	Son
Ang Tong Reachea អង្គទងរាជា		Ponhea Nou ពញានូ	1631–1640	Brother
Padumaraja (Batom Reachea) បទុមរាជា		Ang Non អង្គនន់	1640–1642	Cousin (Note: Son of Outey, which was the brother to Chey Chettha II)
Ramadhipati (Reameathiptei I) or Sultan Ibrahim រាមាធិបតីទី១		Ponhea Chan ពញាចន្ទ	1642–1658	Cousin
Paramaraja V (Barom Reachea V) បុរមរាជា ទី៥		Ang So អង្គសូរ	1658–1672	Cousin
Jayajettha III (Chey Chettha III) ជ័យជេដ្ឋា ទី៣			1672–1673	Nephew (Note: Son of Batom Reachea, which was a brother to Barom Reachea V (both sons of Outey))
Kaev Hua II ព្រះកែវហ៊្វាទី២		Ang Chee អង្គជី	1673–1674	Cousin (Note: Son of Barom Reachea V)
Padumaraja III (Batom Reachea III) បទុមរាជាទី៣		Ang Nan	1674	(Note: Grandson of Outey)
Jayajettha IV (Chey Chettha IV) ជ័យជេដ្ឋា ទី៤		Ang Sor	1675–1695, 1696–1699, 1700–1702 and 1703–1706	(Note: Son of Barom Reachea V)
Tey (♀) ទៃ			1687	Mother
Udaya I (Outey I) ឧទ័យទី១		Ang Yong អង្គយ៉ង	1695–1696	Cousin once removed (Note: Son of Preah Keo II, who was a cousin to Chey Chettha IV)
Parama Ramadhipati (Barom Reameathiptei) បរម រាមាធិបតី		Ang Em	1699–1700 and 1710–1722	(Note: Son of Batom Reachea III)
Dhammaraja III (Thommo Reachea III) សេដ្ឋា ទី២		Ang Tham	1702–1703, 1706–1709 and 1736–1747	(Note: Son of Chey Chettha IV)
Sattha II (Satha II) សេដ្ឋា ទី២		Ang Chey អង្គជ័យ	1722–1736 and 1749	(Note: Son of Barom Reameathiptei)
Dhammaraja IV (Thommo Reachea IV) ស្រីធម្មរាជា		Ang Em អង្គឯម	1747	(Note: Son of Thommo Reachea III)
Ramadhipati III (Reameathiptei III) រាមាធិបតីទី៣		Ang Tong អង្គទង	1748–1749, 1755–1758	Brother-in-law
Jayajettha V (Chey Chettha V) ជ័យជេដ្ឋា ទី៥		Ang Snguon អង្គស្ងួន	1749–1755	Brother-in-law
Udayaraja II (Outey Reachea II) ឧទ័យរាជា ទី២		Ang Ton អង្គតន់	1758–1775	Cousin twice removed (Note: Grandson of Ang Tong)
Ramaraja (Ream Reachea) ព្រះរាមរាជា		Ang Non II អង្គនន់ទី ២	1775–1779	Cousin once removed (Note: Son of Chey Chettha V)
Narayanaraja III (Neareay Reachea III) នារាយណ៍រាជាទី ៣ ។		Ang Eng អង្គអេង	1779–1782, 1794–1796	Cousin twice removed (Note: Son Outey II)
Regency, Outey Reachea III being a minor: 1796–1806
Udayaraja III (Outey Reachea III) ឧទ័យរាជា ទី៣		Ang Chan II អង្គចន្ទ	1806–1834	Son
Ang Mey (♀) អង្គម៉ី		Ksat Trey	1835–1840, 1844–1846	Daughter
Hariraksa Rama Issaradhipati (Harireak Reamea Issarathiptei) ហរិរក្សរាមាឥស្សរាធិបតី		Ang Duong អង្គដួង	1848–1860	Uncle
Norodom Prohmbarirak នរោត្ដម ព្រហ្មបរិរក្ស		Ang Voddey អង្គវតី	19 October 1860 – 11 August 1863	Son

== Modern period (1863–present) ==
=== French protectorate of Cambodia (1863–1953) ===
Name	Portrait	House	Birth	Death	Relationship to predecessor
Norodom Prohmbarirak នរោត្ដម ព្រហ្មបរិរក្ស; 11 August 1863 – 24 April 1904 (40 years, 257 days)		Norodom	3 February 1834; Angkor Borei	24 April 1904; Phnom Penh; Aged: 70 years, 81 days	Son
Sisowath Chamchakrapong ស៊ីសុវត្ថិ ចមចក្រពង្ស; 27 April 1904 – 9 August 1927 (23 years, 104 days)		Sisowath	7 September 1840; Mongkol Borey	9 August 1927; Phnom Penh; Aged: 86 years, 336 days	Half-brother
Sisowath Monivong ស៊ីសុវត្ថិ មុនីវង្ស; 9 August 1927 – 23 April 1941 (13 years, 257 days)		Sisowath	27 December 1875; Phnom Penh	23 April 1941; Kampot; Aged: 65 years, 117 days	Son
Norodom Sihanouk នរោត្តម សីហនុ 24 April 1941 – 2 March 1955 (13 years, 312 days)		Norodom	31 October 1922; Phnom Penh	15 October 2012; Beijing; Aged: 89 years, 350 days	Maternal grandson

=== First Kingdom of Cambodia (1953–1970) ===
Name	Portrait	House	Birth	Death	Relationship to predecessor
Norodom Suramarit នរោត្តម សុរាម្រិត; 3 March 1955 – 3 April 1960 (5 years, 31 days)		Norodom	6 March 1896; Phnom Penh	3 April 1960; Phnom Penh; Aged: 64 years, 28 days	Father
Sisowath Kossamak (♀) ស៊ីសុវត្ថិ កុសុមៈ 20 June 1960 – 9 October 1970 (10 years, 111 days) (Note: Queen Sisowath Kossamak was not an official monarch, but a "symbol, incarnation, and representative" of the dynasty after the death of her husband, King Norodom Suramarit. Norodom Sihanouk appointed himself chief of state whose powers equal that of a traditional monarch.)		Sisowath (by birth); Norodom (by marriage)	9 April 1904; Phnom Penh	27 April 1975; Beijing; Aged: 71 years, 18 days	Consort

=== Second Kingdom of Cambodia (1993–present) ===
Name	Portrait	House	Birth	Death	Relationship to predecessor
Norodom Sihanouk នរោត្តម សីហនុ 24 September 1993 – 7 October 2004 (11 years, 13 days)		Norodom	31 October 1922; Phnom Penh	15 October 2012; Beijing; Aged: 89 years, 350 days	Son
Norodom Sihamoni នរោត្តម សីហមុនី 14 October 2004 – present (22 years, 39 days)		Norodom	14 May 1953; Phnom Penh	Living; Age: 73 years, 192 days	Son

== Royal symbols ==
Royal Arms of Cambodia (1953–1970), restored 1993

Royal Arms of Cambodia (1864–1953), lesser arms (1953–1970)

Royal Standard of the King of Cambodia (until 1970)

Royal Standard of the King of Cambodia (since 1993)

== See also ==
- Family tree of monarchs
- List of heads of state of Cambodia
- Prime Minister of Cambodia
  - List of prime ministers of Cambodia
- Devaraja
- Abolition of monarchy
