= Barom Reachea V =

King of Cambodia (1658–1672)

Barom Reachea V (Paramaraja V)
- King of Cambodia

King of Cambodia
- Reign: 1658–1672
- Predecessor: Ramathipadi I (Sultan Ibrahim)
- Successor: Chey Chettha III
- Born: 1628
- Died: December 1672 (aged 43–44)
- Spouse: Neang Mneang Pou; Neak Mneang Tei; Gama Kshatriyi
- Issue: Preah Keo II; Chey Chettha IV; Princess Sri Thida; Princess Yi; Princess Sujativathi
Names
- Brhat Karuna Visesa Brhat Pada Samdach Sdach Brhat Rajankariya Parama Rajadhiraja Ramadipati Sri Suriya Varman Paramabansa Chakrapati Sandhit Jaya Isvara Kambul Kambuja Maha Indrapati Gururatta Rajadhani Mandisila Mahasthana Parama Bupati Jaya Amachas Jivitha Ludhibana
- Father: Outey
- Mother: Anak Nang Mom (Similar to Nayak Ananga Mama)

Barom Reachea V (Khmer: បរមរាជាទី៥, also known as Paramaraja V (from Pali), born Ang Sô (Khmer: អង្គសូរ); 1628–December 1672) was King of Cambodia from 1658 to 1672.

Ang So was the second son of regent Outey. In 1658, Ponhea Chan (Sultan Ibrahim) overthrew Outey and massacred his family. Ang So and his brother Ang Tan revolted against Chan. At first, they were defeated and took refuge by Neak Ang Chov (Princess Ngoc Van). The latter convinced them to seek help from Huế.

Reinforced by a Vietnamese army, they took the offensive in October 1658. They defeated and killed their own brother Ang Em, who had sided with Ponhea Chan, in a naval battle. The Vietnamese captured Chan, locked him in an iron cage and deported to Quảng Bình, where he soon died.

Ang So ascended the throne under the name of Barom Reachea VIII or Paramaraja V. For Huế's help, Cambodia granted permission to the Vietnamese to settle in Cambodia, to own lands and agreed to pay tribute to Huế.

In December 1672, he was killed and usurped by his nephew Chey Chettha III.

== Cambodia-Annam conflict ==
After King Ang Sour held a military coup to overthrow King Ang Chan I to seize the throne with the support of the Annam Emperor at that time, in 1658 CE, the king of Annam requested the Cambodia King talk on Cambodian Ministry of Customs to take control of two Cambodia territories that the king of Annam had lent to King Chey Cestha II. Annam requested the right to collect taxes from its own people who were increasingly settling in these two areas, for order to gather resources to resist the invasion from the northern near Tonkin call Yuan Dai Viet, who had been continuously increasing their attacks on the Annam, owing Annam gratitude for helping him seize the throne in the past, King Ang Sour agreed to this proposal. Shortly thereafter, at the end of 1658 CE, Annam unilaterally drew a border line, seizing Cambodian territory at the point of O'Kap province in Ba Ria district (Ba Ria - Vung Tau), claiming that many of its people had lived there for a long time. However, the Cambodian side at that time did not agree, and launched an attack and burned down 2,000 Annamese houses in Ba Ria. Therefore, Cambodia and Annam announced the severance of relations from that time on.

== Restoration of Cambodia-Dutch relations ==
In 1667 CE, to restore diplomatic relations between Cambodia and the Dutch of Holland, King Borom Reachea VI allowed Dutch merchants to reopen their business establishments in Cambodia. Dutch traders resumed their business activities in Kampong Luong, located in Ponhea Leu district, Kandal province, under the management of "Johannes Besselman". However, Dutch business establishments often clashed with Chinese traders. At that time, a man named Baren established himself as the king of the located and planned to seize the throne from the King Ang Sour. So he ordered an army to suppress him, capture him and execute him. He then appointed his younger brother, Prince Ang Ton, as the Opheak yoreach (ឧភយោរាជ) mean Royal tittle of the next king. In 1672 CE, he prepared wedding his daughter, Ang Thida, and his nephew, Preah Srei Chey Chet, the son of Ang Non. However, a few months later, Preah Srei Cheychet, sent his followers to the royal palace and killed Borom Reachea VI, his father-in-law. Meanwhile, Ang Ton was defeated and fled to Annam with his nephew, Ang Non II, the son of Ang Im. Preah Srei Cheychet ascended the throne with the Royal title call: Preah Botum Reachea II.

Barom Reachea V Varman Dynasty Born: 1628 Died: 1672
Regnal titles
Preceded by Ponhea Chan	King of Cambodia; 1658–1672	Succeeded by Chey Chettha III
