= Chey Chettha III =

- King of Cambodia

King of Cambodia
- Reign: 1672–1673
- Predecessor: Barom Reachea V
- Successor: Preah Keo II
- Born: 1639
- Died: 1673 (aged 33–34)
- Spouse: Sri Thida Kshatriyi; Gama Kshatriyi; Preah Neang Devi Kshatryi
Names
- Samdach Brhat Dharmasuriya Varman Padma Rajadhiraja Parama Bupati
- Father: Batom Reachea
- Mother: Vararajini Kshatriyi

Chey Chettha III (Khmer: ជ័យជេដ្ឋាទី៣; 1639–1673) or Batom Reachea II was a Cambodian king from 1672 to 1673.

Chey Chettha III was the only son of Batom Reachea. In 1671, he became the son-in-law of his uncle, King Barom Reachea V, by marrying his eldest daughter, Princess Sri Thida Kshatriyi. In December 1672, he murdered his father-in-law and seized the throne, and forced his cousin Bhagavatti Dav Kshatriyi (also the wife of his uncle Prince Ang Tan) to be his wife.

Chey Chettha III was assassinated by the Chams and Malays in the employ of his wife, Gama Kshatriyi, just five months after his coronation, in April (or May) 1673.

Chey Chettha III Varman Dynasty Born: 1639 Died: 1673
Regnal titles
Preceded by Barom Reachea V	King of Cambodia; 1672–1673	Succeeded by Preah Keo II
