= Thommo Reachea II =

- King of Cambodia

King of Cambodia
- Reign: 1628–1631
- Predecessor: Chey Chettha II
- Successor: Ang Tong Reachea
- Ouprayorach: Outey
- Born: 1602
- Died: 1631 (aged 28–29); Khsach Kandal, Cambodia
- Father: Chey Chettha II
- Mother: Anak Munang Sukriyi

Thommo Reachea II (1602–1631), also known as Ponhea To (Khmer: ពញាតូ) or Cau Bana Tu, was the Cambodian king who reigned from 1628 to 1631.

== Biography ==
According to Ly Vou Ong, the last curator of the National Museum of Cambodia before the fall of Phnom Penh, Ponhea To was the eldest son of Chey Chettha II. He succeeded his father as king in 1628. At the same time, he appointed his uncle Outey as regent, assuming the title uprayorach (ឧភយោរាជ), the title usually borne by kings who had abdicated but retained executive powers.

Ponhea To was betrothed to his half-sister Ang Vathi, however, Ang Vathi later married Outey. As a learned king, he had many concubines and disregarded political affairs, leaving them to his uncle. In 1630, he fell deeply in love with Ang Vathi while on a visit to Angkor. The lovers eloped but both were killed by Outey's foreign mercenaries in Khsach Kandal.

== Historiography ==
The reign of Thomma Reachea II is representative of an era of downfall of the Khmer monarchy, reaching a point where it was almost annihilated as the former Khmer empire was swallowed up by Annam to the East, Siam to the West and the Malay Chams from the South.

== Posterity ==
=== Veneration: Wat Sar Sar 100, a romantic pagoda ===
While Wat Sar Sar 100 or 100-pillar Pagoda is mistakenly known as the royal stupa of Princess Varapheaktr, the daughter of King Ang Chan II killed by a crocodile named Nen Thun, it is actually the stupa where the royal ashes of many Khmer kings and royal relatives in the 16th and 17th century are kept, and most notably those of Preah Reach Samphea or Ponhea To. Both legends however give this religious pilgrimage a romantic accent. The pagoda was renovated and covered by the new structure in 1955.

=== Literature: a classic Khmer novel ===
In 2002, Cambodian novelist Kong Bunchhoeun wrote a romanced novel of the legend of Preah Reach Samphea critically highlighting events in Cambodian society – from the king's leadership, evolution of poetry to the consequences of sexual desires.

=== Morality: a narrative for sexual education in Cambodia ===
Before he is shot, Preah Reach Samphea etches a poem on the palm leaf, telling people to not be fooled by their sexual desires like him. He leaves a significant message to his people, indirectly apologising for his own shortcomings as king and as an honorable man.

Thommo Reachea II Varman Dynasty Born: 1602 Died: 1631
Regnal titles
Preceded by Chey Chettha II	King of Cambodia; 1629–1631	Succeeded by Ang Tong Reachea
