= Queen Tey =

Queen regnant of Cambodia (1687)

Tey

Queen of Cambodia
- Reign: 1687
- Predecessor: Chey Chettha IV
- Successor: Chey Chettha IV
- Spouse: Barom Reachea V
- Issue: Chey Chettha IV

Tey (Khmer: ទៃ) or Neak Mneang Tei (Khmer: អ្នកម្នាងទៃ) (17th century) was queen regnant of Cambodia in 1687.

She was married to Barom Reachea V, and the mother of King Chey Chettha IV, who ruled five or six times. He first came to the throne in 1675. The position of a queen mother was a very high status position in the Cambodian court at this time period.

In 1687, the king had smallpox and abdicated in favour of his mother Tey. She reigned for few months and returned the throne to her healed son. She was the first female monarch in Cambodia since Queen Jyeṣṭhāryā of Sambhupura. After her short reign, she stepped down and returned the throne to her son.
