= Outey =

- Regent of Cambodia

Ouparach of Cambodia
- Reign: 1618–1627
- King: Chey Chettha II

Ouprayorach of Cambodia
- Reign: 1627–1642
- King: Thommo Reachea II; Ang Tong Reachea; Batom Reachea
- Born: 1577
- Died: 5 January 1642 (aged 64–65)
- Issue: Batom Reachea Barom Reachea V
Names
- Brhat Buddhananatha Samdach Brhat Paramaraja Maha Upayuvaraja Brhat Dharmaya Amachas
- Father: Srei Soriyopear
- Mother: Sri Sujati

Outey (1577 – 5 January 1642) was a Cambodian prince who served as the regent from 1627 to 1642.

Outey was the youngest son of King Soriyopear. He was appointed the ouparach (heir apparent or viceroy) in 1618. He was appointed the regent after Chey Chettha II's death, assuming the title uprayorach (ឧភយោរាជ), the title usually borne by kings who had abdicated but retained executive powers.

Outey married Princess Ang Vathi, who was the former fiancée of king Thommo Reachea II (Ponhea To). The dissatisfied king rebelled against him but was defeated and executed together with Ang Vathi in 1631. Ang Tong Reachea (Ponhea Nou) was crowned the new king. Ang Tong Reachea died in mysterious circumstances in June 1640. Although Ponhea Chan should be the next king, Outey forced Chan to give the crown to his son Batom Reachea.

With the help of Cham and Malay mercenaries, Chan assassinated Outey on 5 January 1642. In the same time Batom Reachea was away on a hunting trip. Chan captured him and had him executed in Oudong.
