= Ang Tong Reachea =

List of kings of Cambodia
- Reign: 1634–1640
- Predecessor: Borom Reachsomphea
- Successor: Botum Reachea
- Born: Oudong city
- Died: 1640; Oudong city
- Issue: None
Names
- Preah Reach Angkar Preah Ang Tong Reachea Thireach Reamea Thipadei
- House: Oudong
- Father: Chey Chestha II
- Religion: Theravada

Ang Tong Reachea (Khmer:|អង្គទងរាជា) or Ponhea Nuor (Khmer:|ពញ្ញានូរ), was the Cambodian king ruled from 1634 to 1640.After the official coronation ceremony in the capital Oudong, in 2178 BE, 1634 AD, Maha Sakarach 1557. His full name was called "Preah Reach Angkar Preah Ang Tong Reachea Thireach Reamea Thipadei" He was the second son of Chey Chestha II, who was promoted and elevated to the throne by his uncle Samdech Preah Uotey after King Reachsomphea was dethroned by Preah Uotey in a military coup.

== Cambodian-Dutch conflict ==
In 1635, Cambodian ships brought products and silk to sell on the island of Java (Indonesia), but these goods were intercepted by the Dutch in the Sea of Makassar in the Sulawesi archipelago and detained for a year. The news of the detention reached the King of Cambodia, So the Cambodia king sent this problem to Samdech Preah Uotey to report this matter for the Dutch to release the Cambodian ships back, However there was no response, Dutch not reply for release the Cambodian ships back. In 1636, a Dutch cargo ship named "Noordwijk" that wanted to sell copper to the Annam but this ship lost map and came to the port of Peam province of Cambodia in the Kampuchea Krom region. At that time, the Cambodian Customs Ministry intercepted and confiscated 30 cannons and 500 haps of copper (1 hap = 15 kg), equivalent to 7.5 tons. The seizure of the goods did not release to the Dutch. Until 1637, the Dutch sent "Henry Hagenaar", the governor-general of Batavia of the Dutch East Indies Company (present-day Jakarta, Indonesia), to Cambodia with four other Dutch ships as a mediator to resolve the dispute over the detention of the Dutch ships. Henry Hagenaar arrived Cambodia in May and His ship face to face of the Portuguese ships , And they have a conflict, After Henry Hagenaar capture Portuguese ship and not care of Cambodia Law. When Henry Hagenaar came to meet the King of Cambodia in the capital of Oudong to The Royal Letter of Credence Ceremony, he was severely reprimanded by the King for his arbitrary seizure of a Portuguese ship. As a result, relations between the Dutch and Cambodia were not good at that time.

== Cambodian invasion of Ayutthaya (1638-1640) ==
In 1638, the Dutch East India Company sent its representative to Cambodia to set up a trading establishment in Cambodia through Commander "Croocq". The opening of the trading establishment in Cambodia was carried out through the representative of the mission, "Johannes Van Hagen". He received a warm welcome from the Cambodia King uncle Samdech Preah Uotey, who took great care in commercial and financial relations with the Dutch. Through trade, Cambodia sold rubber, sandalwood and ivory to the Dutch, and the Dutch provided loans and weapons to Cambodia, causing the Cambodia economy to grow rapidly. In the same year, 1638, King Ang Tong Reachea proposed to return the Cambodia territory that the Annam had lent during the reign of King Chey Chettha II, but this request was postponed by the King of Annam for a while because he was engaged in a war with the Tonkinese of Dai Veit in the north. The King of Annam requested military assistance instead by providing long-gun weapons to the King of Cambodia. Out of concern and not wanting relations between the Kingdom of Annam and Cambodia to be strained, during this time, the King of Cambodia agreed to the request to postpone the return of Kampong Krabey Province of Prey Nokor City (Ho Chi Minh city) and Kampong Srakatrey Province (Đồng Nai) Province to Cambodia. In 1640 AD, with Cambodia having sufficient weapons and ammunition, Cambodia raised an army of 40,000 troops led by Samdech Preah Uotey to invade the Ayutthaya Kingdom. Preah Uotey's army captured Nokor Reach Seima at that time, thus Nokor Reach Seima returned to Cambodian control. Later, unfortunately, Samdech Preah Uotey fell seriously ill and died there.

== Military coup d'état ==
After the death of Samdech Preah Uotey, his son "Ang Non" staged a military coup with the support of the Portuguese. Ang Non's forces captured the capital of Uodong and assassinated Ang Tong Reachea in 1640 AD. After his success, Ang Non announced a change of religion by accepting the Catholic Religion of the Portuguese and decided to include it in the state religion. Ang Non declared himself to the King of Cambodia in the capital of Uodong, with the royal name Botum Reachea I.

Ang Tong Reachea Oudong period Born: Unknown Died: 1640
Regnal titles
Preceded by Borom Reachsomphea	King of Cambodia; 1634–1640	Succeeded by Botum Reachea I
