= Srei Soriyopear =

Srei Soriyoapor ស្រីសុរិយោពណ៌

King of Cambodia
- Reign: 1602 – 1618
- Coronation: 1602
- Predecessor: Kaev Hua I
- Successor: Chey Chettha II
- Born: Longvek, Cambodia
- Died: 1620; Oudong
- Issue: Chey Chettha II; Outey
Names
- Preah Reach Angkar Preah Borom Reachea Thireach Preah Srei Soriyoapor
- House: List of monarchs of Cambodia
- Father: Borom Reachea II
- Religion: Buddhism Theravada

Borom Reachea IV or Srei Soriyoapor (Khmer: បរមរាជាទី៤), ឬ (Khmer: ស្រីសុរិយោពណ៌) (Siam-call: Srei Soriyopear) was the Cambodian king ruled from 1602 to 1618. After the official coronation ceremony in Lavea Em in 2147 BE, 1603 AD, Maha Sakarach 1526, his full name was called "Preah Reach Angkar Preah Borom Reachea Thireach Preah Srei Soriyoapor", He was the second son of the Borom Reachea II and He was the younger brother of Preah Satha I, who was captured by the Siamese king and sent to Ayutthaya which is similar to word Ayodhya, during the Siamese army's attack on Longvek city in 1593.

== Repression of insurgents ==
After Soriyoapor staged a coup to seize the throne from Preah Keo Fva I in 1602, He moved the capital from Slaket Island to establish a new capital in Lvea Em in 1603. During the proclamation of Soriyoapor as King of Cambodia, he issued a letter requesting his two sons from Siam King, who had been held hostage in Ayutthaya, to return to Cambodia to inherit the throne. Naresuan king of Ayutthaya was very upset, but he agreed to Srei Soriyoapor's request, but he kept his eldest son, Chey Chestha, to stay in Ayutthaya, and he sent his second son, Outey Reachea, the youngest son, Let him return to the Kingdom of Cambodia. After Soriyoapor defeated Preah Keo Fva I, but the country has not yet achieved national unity, because many district governors have formed rebel factions and former monarchs, and And they all have their own ambitions to divide Cambodia to rule their respective regions in this way, and that's why Soriyoapor sent two strong generals, Techo Meas and Techo Yot, out to defeat them, All these rebellions. Starting to attack the Baray district chief of Asantuk province (now: Kampong Thom), then to suppress the insurgents in Kork Ses province (present: Banteay Meanchey) and continue to suppress the insurgents in Kampong Siem and Stung Trang districts of Kampong Cham province, Cheung Prey District (Current: Tbong Khmum Province).

== Suppression of relative insurgents ==
The last insurgency in Thmor Koul district, Battambang province, ruled by King Utey Thireach, who was not his real name, his real name was Ponhea Nou, the third son of Borom Reachea II, He was a half-brother with Soriyoapor, but different mother. During the Siamese siege of Longvek 1593, he hid and changed his name so that the Siamese army could not find him. Srei Soriyoapor knew that Utey Thireach was his brother, Ponhea Nou, so he ordered the army chief named Techo Meas to capture Utey Thireach alive by ordering him to be called preah Ream Thmor Koul. Eventually, Utey Thireach was captured and brought to the King, Ponhea Nou, unaware that Srei Soriyoapor was the current king, because he thought he had died in the Longvek battle. With joy and remembrance, Srei Soriyoapor did not punish Ponhea Nou, but appointed Ponhea Nou as the district governor of Samrong Tong province (now: Kampong Speu province) in 1604.

== Alliances with Annam ==
Srei Soriyoapor, the royal name call Borom Reachea IV, reunited Cambodia during a five-year war to crush the rebels, beginning from 1601 to 1605. Only then did he completely suppress the rebels throughout the kingdom. Soriyoapor restored Cambodia through the establishment of a local administrative system and the promotion of religion, allowing for the spread of other religions, as well as Buddhism. It is the state religion, respecting the forms of Theravada Buddhism under the influence of the Siamese mayor. In 1618, in order to turn away from Siamese influence, he sought to forge allies and the kingdom of Annam to use relations with Annam to free itself from Siamese oppression. So he sent an envoy to the Emperor of Annam, at Huế city, The Annam king named Sai Vuong, to propose to his second daughter, Sai Ngọc Vạn, to marry with his son Chey Chestha II (Siam-call: Chey Chettha). The Annamite emperor agreed to the request and arranged for his daughters to be sent on 15 ships with 500 maids and 500 male servants. The coronation took place in Lvea Em, with Annam's daughter being required to change her name to "Ang Zhou" to make it easier to identify her name in Khmer. This alliance displeased the Siamese mayor and raised a large number of troops to invade Cambodia after the death of the Cambodia king Borom Reachea IV or Srei Soriyoapor in 1620.

== Royal family ==
Borom Reachea IV
| Chey Chestha II | Preah Outey |
| Ponhea To | Ang Non |
| Ponhea Nour | Ang Sour |
| Ang Chan I | Ang Ton |

=== Royal Name ===
Chey Chestha II And Son Royal Name
| Name Before The King | Name of Royal Title |
| Ponhea To | Borom Reachsomphea |
| Ponhea Nour | Ang Tong Reachea |
| Ang Chan I Ang Chan Ibrahim | Borom Reachea V |

Preah Outey And Son Royal Name
| Name Before The King | Name of Royal Title |
| Ang Non | Botum Reachea I |
| Ang Sour | Borom Reachea VI |
| Ang Ton | Not Become The King |

Srei Soriyopear Varman Dynasty Born: 1548 Died: 1619
Regnal titles
| Preceded by Kaev Hua I | King of Cambodia; 1603–1618 | Succeeded by Chey Chettha II |
