= Batom Reachea =

Botum Reachea I
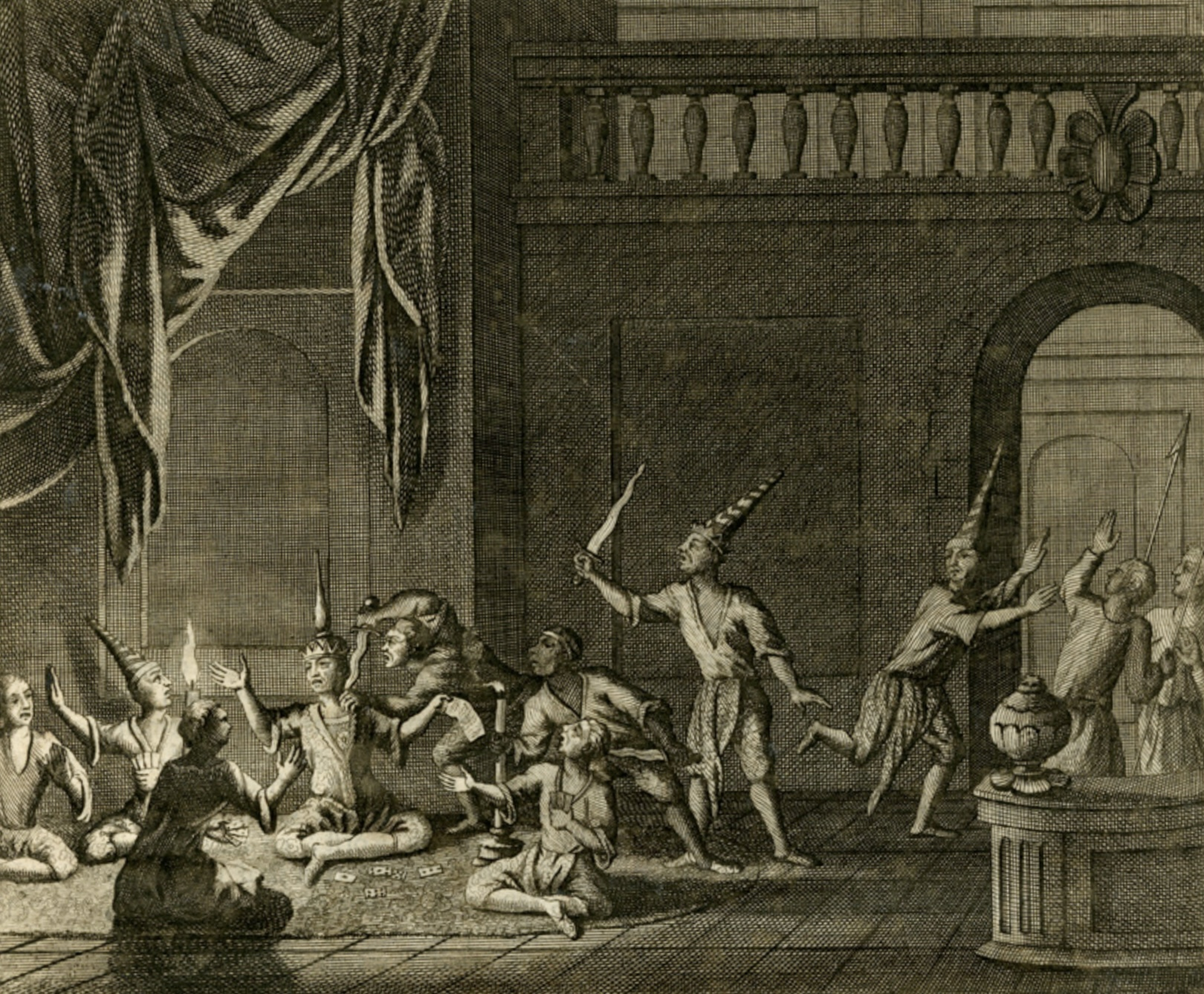
- Murder of the King and his son in Cambodia in 1642.

List of kings of Cambodia
- Reign: 1640–1642
- Predecessor: Ang Tong Reachea
- Successor: Borom Reachea V
- Born: Oudong city
- Died: 1642; Oudong city
- Issue: None
Names
- Preahbat Samdech Preah Botum Reachea Reamea Thipadei
- House: Oudong
- Father: Preah Uotey
- Religion: Catholic

Botum Reachea I (Khmer:|បទុមរាជាទី១) or Ang Non (Khmer:|អង្គនន់) (Siam call Batom Reachea), was the Cambodian king ruled from 1640 to 1642.After the official coronation ceremony in the capital Oudong, in 2184 BE, 1640 AD, Maha Sakarach 1563. His full name was called "Preahbat Samdech Preah Botum Reachea Reamea Thipadei" He was the eldest son of Samdech Preah Uotey, who carried out a military coup to seize power from Ang Tong Reachea in the capital of Uodong. He was a king who ascended to the throne at the young age of only 21. During his reign, he converted to the Catholic Religion of the Europeans.

== Military coup d'état (1642) ==
King Botum Reachea I, who reigned in the capital of Uodong for only two short years, was overthrown by Chao Ponhea Chan, the third son of Preah Chey Cesthea II, in a military coup in 1642 AD, with the support of Japanese merchants and a rebel group from the Khmer Islam group, meaning Cambodians who believed in Islam religion. Chao Ponhea Chan, who succeeded Preah Botum Reachea in the capital of Uodong, had the royal title "Borom Reachea Reameathipadei", which was recognized as the Borom Reachea V.

Batom Reachea Oudong Dynasty Born: 1619 Died: 1642
Regnal titles
Preceded by Ang Tong Reachea	King of Cambodia; 1640–1642	Succeeded by Borom Reachea V
