= Chey Chettha II =

Chey Chestha II

List of kings of Cambodia
- Reign: 1618–1627
- Predecessor: Borom Reachea IV
- Successor: Borom Reachsomphea
- Born: Longvek city
- Died: 1627; Odong Royal Palace,
- Issue: Ponhea To; Ponhea Nou; Ang Chan I Ang Chan Vattey; Bopha Vattey
Names
- Preahbat Samdech Preah Chey Chestha Thireach Reameathipadei
- House: Oudong
- Father: Srei Soriyopear
- Religion: Theravada

Chey Chestha II (Khmer: ជ័យជេស្ឋាទី២; Thai: พระไชยเชษฐาที่ 2; and known by Siam as Chey Chettha II), was the Cambodian king ruled from 1618 to 1627. After the official coronation ceremony in Lavea Em, in 2162 BE, 1618 AD, Maha Sakarach 1541. His full name was called "Preahbat Samdech Preah Chey Chestha Thireach Reameathipadei" and he was the eldest son of the Borom Reachea IV, and Chey Chestha II had a younger brother, Outey, who was captured by the Siamese king, Naresuan, and sent to Ayutthaya during the Siamese siege of Longvek in 1593.

== Moving the capital to Oudong ==
Chey Chestha II During his captivity in Ayutthaya, his father, Soriyoapor, secretly communicated with him, communicating in military language through language codes because he could not trust the people around him for fear of the king. Siamese spies or spies nearby, all letters are subject to strict Siam translation. In a secret message, Srei Soiyoapor told his son, Chey Chestha, to find a way to return to Cambodia and transfer the throne to him. In 1605, the Siamese king, Naresuan, intends to raise an army to invade the Lao kingdom, so Chey Chestha asks the Siamese king to take the opportunity to flee to Cambodia. The Siamese king was unaware of Chey Chestha's intentions.

The Siamese king agreed to the request during a battle with the Laotian army. Chey Chestha fled back to Cambodia. The Siamese king Naresuan, upon hearing that Chey Chestha had fled back to Cambodia, became depressed and died in 1605. Srei Soriyoapor transferred the throne to his son Chey Chestha II including a royal wedding with the daughter of Annam king named Ang Zhou in 1618. Until 1620, Chey Chestha, realizing that Lvea Em was next to the main river, was easy for foreign navies and large warships to attack, so he decided to move the capital from Lvea Em to Udong. Which was a good strategic area, easy to defend itself from the invading enemy, with Annam as the backbone, Chey Chestha abandoned the Siamese tradition and adopted the Khmer tradition instead and did not send tribute to the Siamese to show the Siamese no longer recognized Siam power over Cambodia.

== Cambodian-Siamese War (1621) ==
Cambodian-Siamese war (1621)
- Part of Siamese–Cambodian Wars
Date	1621
Location	Cambodia,Oudong,Kep,Kampong Chhnang,Pursat
Result	Cambodian-Annam victory

Belligerents
Ayutthaya Kingdom	Kingdom of Cambodia; Supported by: annam

Commanders and leaders
Songtham	Chey Chettha II; Nguyễn Phúc Nguyên

Units involved
Royal Siamese Army	Cambodian Army; Oudong army forces; Annam Army; Annam Military Force

Strength
105,000 troops	100,000 troops

Casualties and losses
Approximately 95,000 killed and 10,000 withdraw	Annammite: 20,000 killed Cambodian: 30,000 killed Total:50,000 killed

A Siamese king named Songtham, seeing that the Cambodian king was not subject to his kingdom And turned to Allies with the kingdom of Annam, he was furious and ordered an army to invade Cambodia in 1621. Siam raised 105,000 troops led by a Siamese general named Samdach Thai Da. Siamese general Divided the army into three divisions, the first division of 55,000 troops entered through the Pursat province, the second division of 20,000 troops as the navy entered the sea through Banteay Meas district (now : Kep Province) 30,000 troops as the Navy enters the Tonle Sap River, The three Siamese armies came to attack and capture Udong city. Seeing that there were only 70,000 troops, seeing that he could not resist the Siamese army, he ordered his wife, Ang Zhou, to send a message to ask for help from his father-in-law, with the emperor Annam sending troops. 30,000 troops to help fight Cambodia. Chey Chettha divided the army into three divisions, the first division was led by Techo Yot And Techo Meas led 50,000 troops to fight with the Siamese army in Pursat province, 2nd Regiment led by Preah Outey went to war with Siamese troops in Banteay Meas district (present: Kep province) The third army, the Annamite army, had to be embedded along the river to prevent the Siamese army from landing. The Siamese army was defeated by the Khmer army led by Techo Meas at Pursat province. The Siam navy, which sailed through the strait of Banteay Meas district (Kep province), failed under the auspices of Preah Outey. As for the Siamese navy, which sailed through the Tonle Sap Strait, Siamese warships in each boat carrying between 500 and 1,000 troops fought and the Annamite army along the Tonle Sap River in Kampong Chhnang Province. The Siamese army was prevented from landing by the Annamite artillery. Eventually, all three Siamese armies were severely defeated, and the remaining ten thousand Siamese troops withdrew. Both navies were wiped out, leaving the Annamite army to help and the Khmer army killed more than 20,000 and the Cambodian army killed more than 30,000.

== Siamese invasion of Kampuchea Krom (1622) ==
Siamese invasion of Kampuchea Krom (1622)
- Part of Siamese–Cambodian Wars
Date	1622
Location	Cambodia,Kampuchea Krom,Kiên Giang,Đồng Nai,Ho Chi Minh City
Result	Cambodian-Annam Alliance defensive victory; Siamese Invasion Repelled

Belligerents
Ayutthaya Kingdom	Kingdom of Cambodia; Supported by: annam

Commanders and leaders
Songtham	Chey Chettha II; Nguyễn Phúc Nguyên

Units involved
Royal Siamese Army	Cambodian Army; Oudong army forces; Annam Army; Annam Military Force

Strength
40,000 troops	30,000 troops

Casualties and losses
20,000 Killed	Unknown

Undeterred by the first Siamese king, Song Tham, he ordered the Siamese army to invade Cambodia again in Kampuchea Krom in 1622. 40,000 troops Siam navy launched an attack on a port in Peam province. At that time, Cambodia had only 5,000 navy, and Cambodia was short of navies. Lack of warships to transport troops by water. Chey Chestha requested the help of Annamite troops for the second time, Annam sent 25,000 navies to fight with Cambodia in the battle of Peam province (currently: by the Vietnamese government). Name is included in the provincial of Kien Giang province. Many artillery shells were fired at the warships, eventually the Siamese army was defeated a second time, half of the Siamese army was killed and the other half of the Siamese army withdrew. These two victories of Cambodia became indebted to the Emperor of Annam, and this indebtedness brought weight to the King of Cambodia in agreeing to lend land to two provinces to the Emperor of Annam to set up military bases. Its two locations are Kampong Krabei province of Prey Nokor city (Now: Hochiminh City) and Kampong Srakatrey province of Dong Nai province, where the land loan treaty was made in June 1623.

== Vietnamese military base in Cambodia ==
In 1623, the Trịnh lords of northern Vietnam launched an invasion against the Nguyễn lords in the south. In response, the Nguyễn ruler sought support by sending envoys to Cambodia, requesting the use of two Cambodian territories as military bases from which to counter the northern threat. The envoys noted cultural distinctions: the Nguyễn spoke with a southern Chinese–influenced accent and dressed in styles resembling the Chinese, whereas the Annamites (Central Vietnam) more closely resembled the Cham in attire.

In his appeal, the Nguyễn ruler emphasized the sacrifices his forces were making and warned that, if Cambodia refused, the alliance between the two states would be broken. He threatened that Annam would no longer assist Cambodia against Siamese invasions. King Chey Chestha II, realizing that Cambodia risked being caught between two powerful enemies—the Nguyễn from the east and the Siamese from the west—concluded that concessions were unavoidable. He therefore granted the Nguyễn two territories: Kampong Krabei near Prey Nokor (modern Ho Chi Minh City) and Kampong Srakatrey near Đồng Nai. These were to serve as temporary bases for five years (1623-28), after which they were to be returned to Cambodia.

However, King Chey Chestha II died in 1627 before the agreement could be enforced. The lands were never reclaimed, and by the early 18th century they had been fully absorbed into Vietnamese control, marking the beginning of Cambodia’s loss of the region.

Chey Chettha II Oudong Dynasty Born: 1573 Died: 1627
Regnal titles
Preceded by Borom Reachea IV	King of Cambodia; 1618–1627	Succeeded by Borom Reachsomphea
