= ANG =

Ang, ANG or Äng may refer to:

== Arts and media ==
- Ang 5.0, Angela Chang's fifth Chinese album
- Big Ang (TV series), an American reality television program starring Angela "Big Ang" Raiola
- Mr. Ang, the protagonist of The Alien
- ANG, Mexican DJ duo published mainly by Revealed Recordings and Maxximize Records

== Organizations ==
- Air National Guard, part of the US National Guard
- Australian National Gallery, now the National Gallery of Australia
- Union of Agriculture, Food and Allied Industries, a former Austrian trade union
- ANG Newspapers, a newspaper publisher
- AngloGold Ashanti (JSE ticker symbol)

== People ==
- Ang Lee, Taiwanese filmmaker
- Ang (surname), a common Hokkien and Teochew surname
- Kings of Cambodia:
  - Ponhea Chan, reign name Ang Chan I (r. 1516–1566)
  - Ang Chan II, reign name Outey Reachea III (r. 1796–1806 under regency; 1806–1835)
  - Ang Tong Reachea, born Ponhea Nou (r. 1631–1640)
  - Batom Reachea, born Ang Non (r. 1640–1642)
  - Barom Reachea V, born Ang So (r. 1658–1672)
  - Preah Keo II, born Ang Chee (r. 1673–1674)
  - Batom Reachea III, born Ang Nan (r. 1674)
  - Chey Chettha IV, born Ang Sor (r. 1675–1695, 1696–1699, 1700–1702, 1703–1706)
  - Outey I, born Ang Yong (r. 1695–1696)
  - Barom Reameathiptei, born Ang Em (r. 1699–1700, 1710–1722)
  - Thommo Reachea III, born Ang Tham (r. 1702–1703, 1706–1709, 1736–1747)
  - Satha II, born Ang Chey (r. 1722–1736, 1749)
  - Thommo Reachea IV, born Ang Em (r. 1747)
  - Reameathiptei III, born Ang Tong (r. 1748–1749, 1755–1758)
  - Chey Chettha V, born Ang Snguon (r. 1749–1755)
  - Outey Reachea II, born Ang Ton (r. 1758–1775)
  - Ream Reachea, born Ang Non II (r. 1775–1779)
  - Neareay Reachea III, born Ang Eng (r. 1779–1782, 1794–1796)
  - Ang Mey, born Ksat Trey (r. 1834–1841)
  - Harihak Reamea Issarathiptei, born Ang Duong (r. 1841–1860)

== Places ==
- Äng, a locality in Nässjö Municipality, Sweden
- Angmering railway station, in the UK (National Rail code ANG)
- Angola (IOC, UNDP and licence plate country codes ANG)

== Science and technology ==
- Adsorbed natural gas, a methane storage technique
- Angiopoietin, in biochemistry
- Anguloa, a genus of orchids (abbreviation "Ang")
- Animated Network Graphics, properly APNG, a variant of PNG

== Other uses ==
- Used for the Sikh scripture Guru Granth Sahib meaning limb instead of the referral of page numbers
- Anga, Ang Desh or Ang Mahajanapada, one of the 16 Mahajanapada of Ancient India
- Australian National Gallery, now the National Gallery of Australia
- Netherlands Antillean guilder, the currency of Curaçao and Sint Maarten, by ISO 4217 currency code
- Old English, or Anglo-Saxon (Ænglisc) (ISO 639 language code "Ang")

== See also ==
- Aang (安昂), main character of Avatar: The Last Airbender
