= Siamese–Vietnamese War (1771–1773) =

18th-century war

- Part of Siamese–Vietnamese Wars
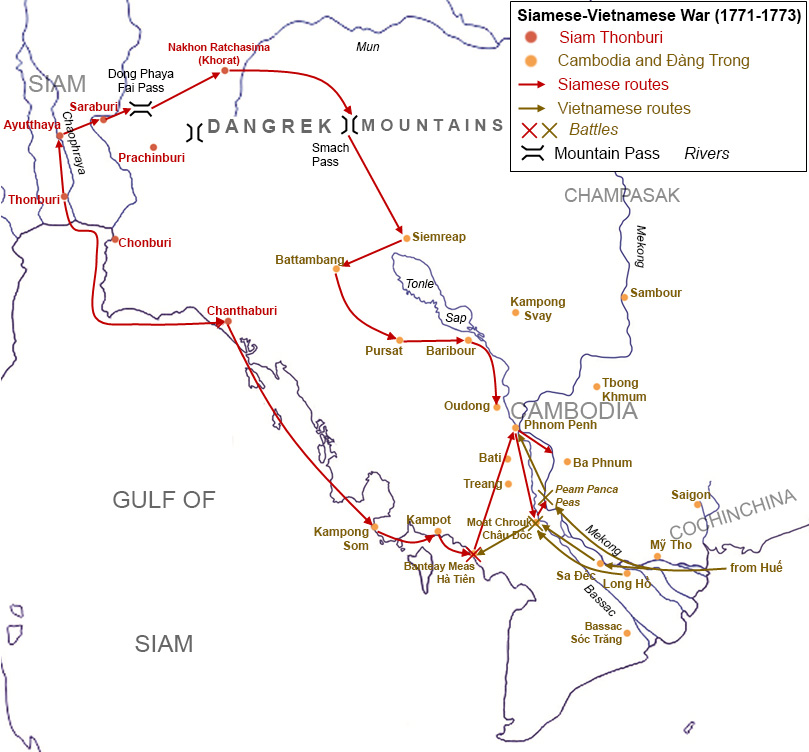
- Siamese invasion of Cambodia and Hà Tiên in 1771 and Vietnamese counter-offensives in 1772; Red represents the Siamese. Yellow and Brown represent Cambodia and the Nguyen Lord of Cochinchina.
Date	October 1771 – March 1773
Location	Cambodia, Southern Vietnam
Result	Siamese victory

Belligerents
Thonburi Kingdom (Siam)	Đàng Trong (Nguyễn Lords); Oudong Kingdom; Hà Tiên polity

Commanders and leaders
Taksin; Phraya Yommarat Thongduang; Phraya Anuchit Racha Bunma; Chaophraya Chakri Mud; Phraya Phiphit Chen Lian; Phraya Phichai Aisawan Yang Jinzong; Ang Non	Nguyễn Phúc Thuần; Nguyễn Cửu Đàm; Tống Phước Hiệp; Nguyễn Hữu Nhơn; Nguyễn Khoa Thuyên; Outey II (Ang Ton); Oknha Yumreach Tol; Mạc Thiên Tứ; Mạc Tử Dung; Mạc Tử Thảng

Strength
20,000	More than 12,000

The Siamese–Vietnamese War (1771–1773) was a war between Siam (modern Thailand) of the Thonburi Period in the reign of King Taksin and the Nguyễn Lords of Cochinchina or Southern Vietnam. The war also involved Cambodia and the Hà Tiên polity, which were allies of the Nguyen Lord.

== Background ==
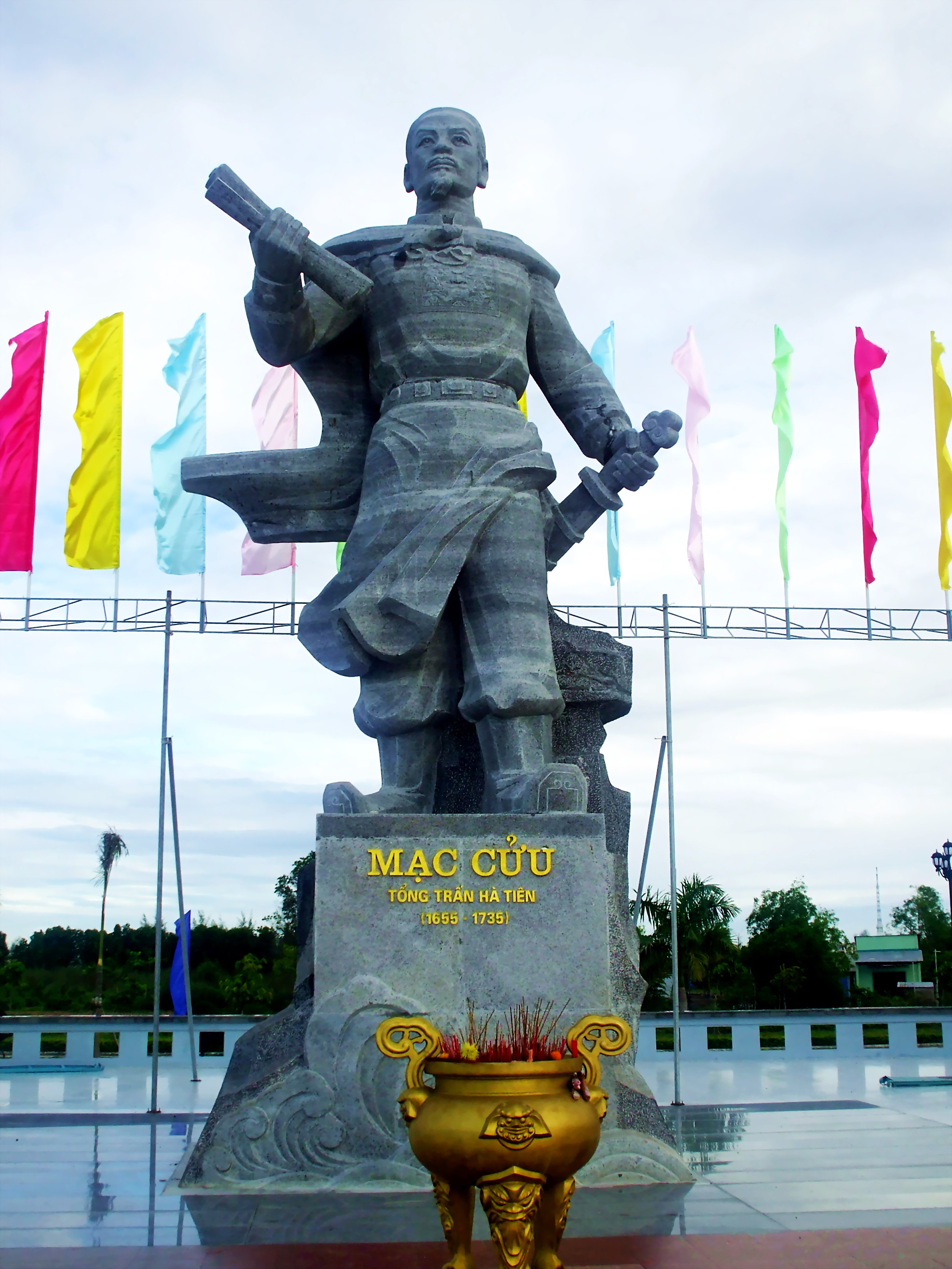
Statue of Mạc Cửu in Hà Tiên, Kiên Giang province.

After the Fall of the Ming dynasty, a Cantonese named Mo Jiu or Mạc Cửu (鄚玖) migrated from Leizhou, Guangdong Province to settle in the Cambodian coastal port town of Bantaey Meas (Khmer:បន្ទាយមាស) or modern Hà Tiên in 1671. Banteay Maes was populated by the native Cambodians and the Chinese traders. Mạc Cửu ran a local gambling den in Banteay Maes and managed to propel himself to the riches. He was granted the rank of Oknha from the Cambodian king for his wealth. Mạc Cửu and his Cantonese followers built a Chinese-style town of Hà Tiên. In 1707, Mạc Cửu submitted to become a subordinate of the Nguyen Lord Nguyễn Phúc Chu and was awarded with the title Cửu Ngọc hầu, leading to the foundation of the Hà Tiên polity. Mạc Cửu died in 1735 and was succeeded by his son Mạc Thiên Tứ (also known as Mo Shilin 莫士麟) as the ruler of Hà Tiên. Under the rule of Mạc Thiên Tứ, Hà Tiên rose to become the commercial and political center of the region.

=== Dynastic Conflicts in Cambodia ===
In 1714, King Ang Tham or Thommo Reachea of Cambodia was driven off by Kaev Hua, who was supported by the Vietnamese Nguyen Lord. Ang Tham took refuge in Ayutthaya where King Thaisa granted him a place to reside. Three years later, in 1717, the Siamese king sent armies and navy to reclaim Cambodia for Ang Tham, leading to the Siamese–Vietnamese War (1717). The Siamese navy was defeated at Hà Tiên, while on land King Kaev Hua of Cambodia decided to capitulate and submitted to the Siamese. The Siamese returned with satisfaction but the Cambodian court remained pro-Vietnamese. In 1722, Kaev Hua abdicated in favor of his son Satha. Ang Tham, who had spent about two decades in Ayutthaya, finally returned to Cambodia and reclaimed the throne for himself in 1737, prompting the pro-Vietnamese Satha to flee to Vietnam. Ang Tham reigned until his death in 1747 and the succession was received by his relative Ang Tong Reameathiptei. Satha was escorted by the Vietnamese armies to successfully retake his Cambodian throne in 1748 with Ang Tong fleeing to Ayutthaya. King Borommokot of Ayutthaya sent Siamese armies in 1749 to expel Satha. Satha again fled to Vietnam where he died. The Siamese installed Ang Sngoun, son of Ang Tham, as Chey Chettha the new pro-Siamese king of Cambodia. Within the span of two years 1747–1749, three Cambodian kings had ascended the throne.

In 1757, Prince Ang Hing the Uprayorach (viceroy) came into conflicts with Prince Ang Ton the Ouparach (deputy viceroy). Ang Ton was defeated and took refuge in Hà Tiên under the protection of Mạc Thiên Tứ (known as Neak Preah Sotoat in Cambodian chronicles). Ang Ton professed himself to be an adopted son of Mạc Thiên Tứ. Mạc Thiên Tứ then gained the permission from the Nguyen Lord Nguyễn Phúc Khoát to install Ang Ton as the new king of Cambodia. Mạc Thiên Tứ sent armies to bring Ang Ton back to Cambodia. Ang Hing was defeated and killed in battle. King Chey Chettha fled to Pursat where he fell ill and died. Ang Ton ascended the Cambodian throne as Outeyreachea the pro-Vietnamese king of Cambodia. Ang Non, son of Chey Chettha and political ally of Ang Hing, was captured and encaged. A loyal servant happened to secretly open the cage, allowing Ang Non to flee to Ayutthaya in 1758. The new Cambodian King Ang Ton repaid Mạc Thiên Tứ for his supports by ceding five prefectures, including Kampong Som and Kampot in Southern Cambodia, to Mạc Thiên Tứ. This led to the formation of the territories of the Hà Tiên polity, which was, in turn, under the suzerainty of the Nguyen Lords' regime. The Vietnamese settled on the new territories of the Mekong Delta and maintained military garrisons at Long Hồ, Sa Đéc and Châu Đốc.

=== Thonburi, Hà Tiên and Qing China ===
During the Late Ayutthaya Period, the Teochew Chinese people from Guangdong Province had migrated overseas to settle in the eastern Siamese coastal port towns, most notably in Bang Plasoi and Chanthaburi. In January 1767, about three months before the Fall of Ayutthaya, Phraya Tak, a Siamese general of Teochew ancestry with personal name Zheng Zhao (鄭昭) or Zheng Xin (鄭信), led his forces to successfully break through the Burmese encirclement and left Ayutthaya for Chanthaburi. The Cambodian Prince Ang Non also joined this entourage of Phraya Tak. Ang Non then became one of the original followers of Phraya Tak. In June 1767, Phraya Tak managed to seize Chanthaburi, which had been a major Teochew entrepôt, and made his base there. Pu Lan the Phraya Chanthaburi fled to take refuge in Hà Tiên.

After the Fall of Ayutthaya in April 1767, Prince Chao Sisang (Thai: เจ้าศรีสังข์), a son of Prince Thammathibet, took refuge in Bang Plasoi where he found the French missionaries from Ayutthaya. The French missionaries took the Ayutthayan prince with them to Hà Tiên and proceeded to Oudong, Cambodia. Another Ayutthayan prince, Prince Chao Chui (Thai: เจ้าจุ้ย), a grandson of King Thaisa, took asylum in Hà Tiên under the protection of Mạc Thiên Tứ. Phraya Tak sent a letter to Mạc Thiên Tứ, requesting him to hand over the Ayutthayan princes. Mạc Thiên Tứ, whose interests was to retain the Ayutthayan princes as political bargains, refused. Mạc Thiên Tứ came into conflicts with the Teochew merchant-pirates of the eastern Siamese shores of the Gulf of Siam. In 1769 or 1770, Mạc Thiên Tứ sent Cantonese forces from Hà Tiên to attack Chanthaburi and Trat. Cambodian chronicles stated that the Hà Tiên forces suffered losses at Chanthaburi.

After Phraya Tak had enthroned himself as King Taksin in December 1767, he sent his diplomatic envoy to Guangzhou in August 1768 to request for the imperial recognition in order to secure his relative legitimacy over other rival regimes and lucrative trade with the Chinese court under the tally system. On this occasion, Taksin's name first appeared in Chinese records as Gan Enchi (甘恩敕). The Beijing court sent Zheng Rui as an official delegate to investigate the events at Hà Tiên in December 1768, where Zheng Rui was informed about Phraya Tak who had established his power in Siam. Zheng Rui met with the Ayutthayan Prince Chui in Hà Tiên. Mạc Thiên Tứ sent his delegate in a competing mission to Guangzhou, informing the Chinese court that the Ayutthayan princes, the scions of the fallen Ban Phlu Luang dynasty, had been with him in Hà Tiên. The Beijing court refused to recognize Taksin as ruler of Siam in the Chinese tributary system because of the existence of the Ayutthayan princes. Emperor Qianlong urged Taksin, in his imperial letter, to be loyal to the former dynasty of Ayutthaya and to find any remaining descendants of the old dynasty to be enthroned. In 1771, as China and Burma had been engaging in the Sino-Burmese War, Taksin sent Burmese captives from the Burmese War to China to convince Beijing that China and Siam shared the same enemy – Burma.

=== Siamese Invasion of Cambodia (1769) ===
In 1769, King Taksin of Thonburi sent a letter to the pro-Vietnamese King Ang Ton of Cambodia, urging Cambodia to resume sending the submissive tribute of golden and silver trees to Siam. Ang Ton refused on the grounds that Taksin was a Chinese usurper. Taksin was angered and ordered the invasion to subjugate Cambodia and install the pro-Siamese Ang Non on the Cambodian throne. He dispatched the Siamese troops into Cambodia as follows;

- Phraya Aphai Ronnarit Thongduang (future King Rama I) and Phraya Anuchit Racha Bunma (later Prince Maha Sura Singhanat) would lead the army of 2,000 men to invade Cambodia in the north from Nakhon Ratchasima.
- Phraya Kosa Chen Lian would invade Cambodia from the west through Prachinburi.

From Nakhon Ratchasima, Phraya Aphai Ronnarit and Phraya Anuchit Racha led the Siamese armies to cross the Dangrek mountains to attack and successfully occupy Siemreap. Oknha Kralahom Pang, the Cambodian commander, was killed in battle. Phraya Kosa Chen Lian seized Battambang. King Ang Ton was then resolved to personally lead the Cambodian fleet to face the invading Siamese. The two Siamese commanders mustered the Siamese fleet to battle the Cambodians in the Tonle Sap.

During these campaigns, King Taksin was coincidentally on his campaigns subjugating the Nakhon Si Thammarat regime in the south. However, rumors reached the Siamese in Cambodia that King Taksin had perished in battle. Phraya Aphai Ronnarit and Phraya Anuchit Racha then decided to retreat from the Cambodian battlefront to return to Thonburi. However, they soon learned that the rumors were false and Taksin was alive and well. Chen Lian also retreated from Cambodia and informed the king about the premature retreat of the two commanders. Anuchit Racha explained to King Taksin that, due to the rumors, he was obliged to retreat in order to return to prevent the Thonburi city from descending into upheavals. King Taksin was satisfied with this explanation and praised Anuchit Racha for his loyalty. Cambodia was then spared from Siamese occupation and remained under Vietnamese influence for a moment.

== Campaigns ==
=== Siamese preparations ===
In 1771, King Taksin resumed his plans to invade Cambodia to find Prince Sisang and Prince Chui and to install the Cambodian Prince Ang Non as the new king of Cambodia to replace the pro-Vietnamese King Ang Ton. Taksin wanted to take Hà Tiên because it was a prosperous port and a potential rival to Siam. Taksin ordered the Siamese forces to invade Cambodia and Hà Tiên as follows;

- Phraya Yommarat Thongduang (future King Rama I) would lead the land army of about 10,000 men, together with the Cambodian Prince Ang Non, to invade Cambodia by land through Battambang and Pursat to attack Oudong.
- King Taksin himself would lead the navy to invade and attack Hà Tiên, with Phraya Phiphit Chen Lian (陳聯, called Trần Liên in Vietnamese sources) the acting Phrakhlang as the admiral and the Chinese commander Phraya Phichai Aisawan (personal name Yang Jinzong, 楊進宗) as vanguard. The Siamese navy was manned by about 15,000 personnel with 400 battleships or war-junks.

=== Siamese conquest of Hà Tiên ===
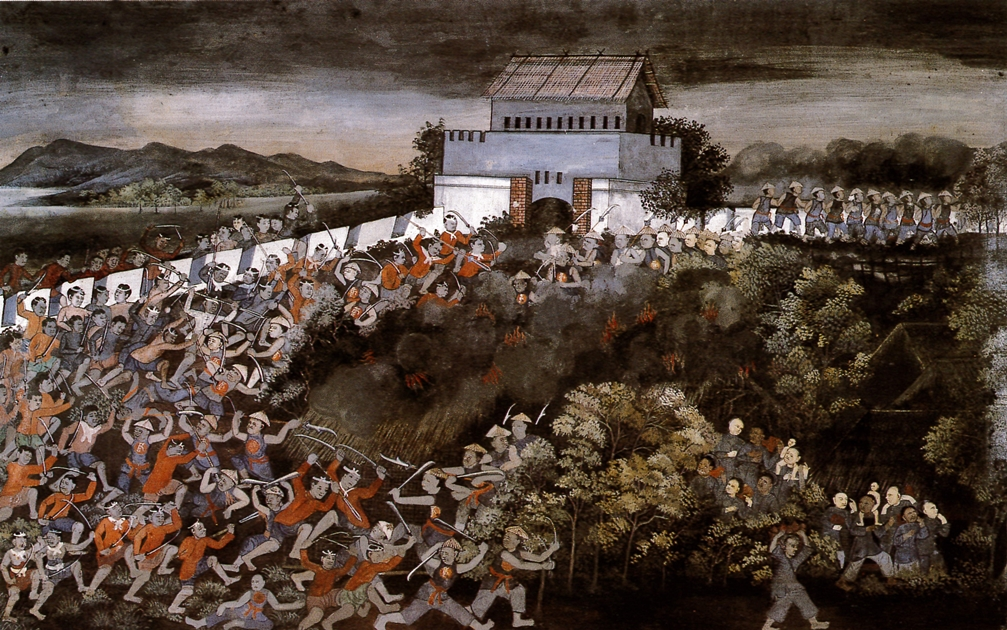
An illustration of Siamese armies took Hà Tiên in control at dawn of November 17, 1771.

The Siamese king and his grand naval entourage left Thonburi on November 3, 1771, for the Paknam. When the royal fleet reached Chanthaburi, the king stayed there, ordering Chen Lian and Yang Jinzong to proceed to Kampong Som. Chen Lian was able to take Kampong Som. Then King Taksin continued his fleet, reaching Hà Tiên on November 14. Taksin took commanding position on a hill to the south of Hà Tiên, where the canons were brought uphill to shell the city. Taksin ordered Chaophraya Chakri Mud to lay the naval siege on Hà Tiên. The king also ordered Phraya Phichai Aisawan Yang Jinzong to write a letter to Mạc Thiên Tứ, urging him either to fight or surrender. Mạc Thiên Tứ replied that he would take three days to decide, according to Thai chronicles. However, after three days, Mạc Thiên Tứ was silent. Mạc Thiên Tứ was in dire conditions. He managed only to raise a troop of 2,000 Chinese men to defend Hà Tiên. He had requested military supports from the Nguyen Lord Nguyễn Phúc Thuần. However, the Nguyen court held back and did not send troops due to an earlier incident in 1767, in which Mạc Thiên Tứ also requested for Nguyen troops against the Siamese who did not come. Mạc Thiên Tứ ordered his second son Mạc Tử Dung to command the left-flank troop and his third son Mạc Tử Thảng to command the battle ships to defend the port.

In the night of November 16, King Taksin ordered the Siamese forces to successfully seize Hà Tiên that night lest they would face punishments. The Siamese forces stormed Hà Tiên that night, both by land and water. The Siamese were able to penetrate into the port. Mạc Thiên Tứ held Hà Tiên until the morning of November 17, 1771. The Siamese were able to take Hà Tiên. Mạc Thiên Tứ fled to Châu Đốc, while his three sons Mạc Tử Hoàng, Mạc Tử Dung and Mạc Tử Thảng took refuge in Kien Giang under Vietnamese protection. Prince Chui, the former prince of Ayutthaya, also attempted to flee by boat but he was captured by Thonburi forces. Taksin also managed to capture two daughters of Mạc Thiên Tứ. King Taksin appointed Phraya Phiphit Chen Lian as the new governor of Hà Tiên with the title of Phraya Rachasetthi. Phraya Phichai Aisawan Yang Jinzong was made to succeed Chen Lian as the acting Phrakhlang.

=== Siamese conquest of Cambodia ===
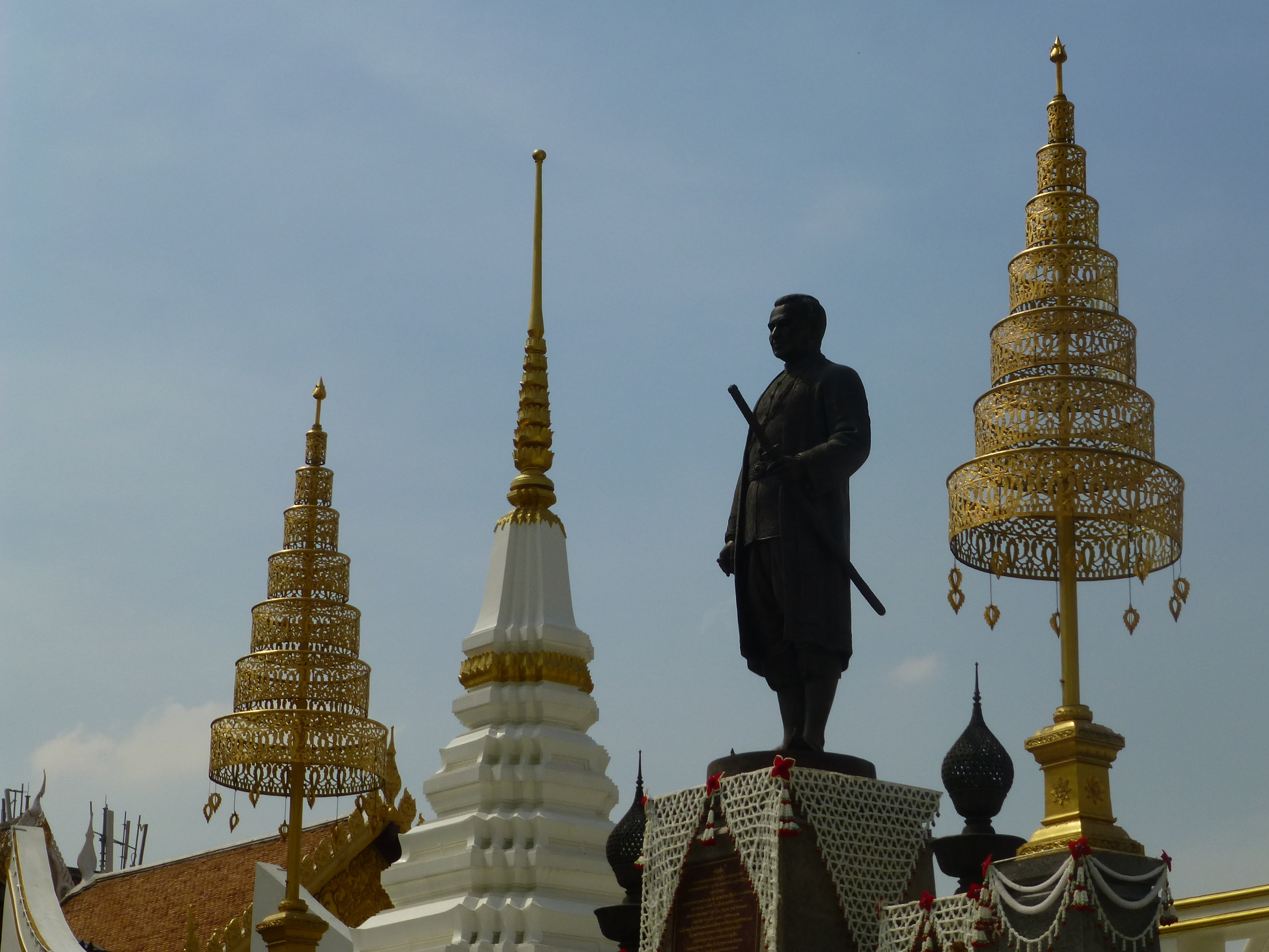
Phraya Yommarat Thongduang, a Siamese commander in the Cambodian campaigns

Phraya Yommarat Thongduang left Thonburi in October 1771 to bring his armies into Cambodia through Prachinburi. Phraya Yommarat swept through the Cambodian towns of Battambang, Pursat and Baribour towards Oudong. As the Siamese were approaching Oudong, King Ang Ton was informed by Mạc Thiên Tứ about the fall of Hà Tiên. Ang Ton, along with his family and the Siamese Prince Sisang, then decided to embark on boats to take refuge downstream at Trolong Khoas near Ba Phnum. The panicked Cambodian populace also fled in great numbers towards Ba Phnum. King Ang Ton proceeded from Trolong Khoas to Baria (modern Châu Thành) to be under Vietnamese protection, while the Cambodian common people fortified themselves with the support of Oknha Yumreach Tol near Ba Phnum in defense against the invading Siamese. Phraya Yommarat and Ang Non were then able to take Oudong and Phnom Penh.

After pacifying Hà Tiên, King Taksin began his marching on November 20 from Hà Tiên towards Cambodia in order to pursue and find Mạc Thiên Tứ. Going through dense forests of Cambodia, Taksin finally reached Phnom Penh on November 27, where he was told by Chaophraya Chakri Mud that Oudong had fallen to the Siamese and Ang Ton had fled to Ba Phnum. Taksin then marched his armies towards Ba Phnum in his efforts to pursue the Cambodian king. The royal Siamese army met with the wooden fort of the Cambodian common people near Ba Phnum. Taksin ordered Chakri Mud to attack, successfully defeating and dispersing the Cambodian self-defense forces. Many Cambodians were taken as captives. Taksin and his armies then returned to Phnom Penh.

Prince Ang Non arrived from Oudong to meet with King Taksin in Phnom Penh. Taksin then made Ang Non the ruler of Cambodia and assigned Phraya Yommarat to be Ang Non's guardian and to be in charge of affairs in Cambodia. The captured Cambodians from Ba Phnum were returned to Phnom Penh and Oudong. He also assigned Chaophraya Chakri Mud with the task of pacifying the Mekong Delta and to find Mạc Thiên Tứ. Taksin returned to Hà Tiên on December 9.

Mạc Thiên Tứ at Châu Đốc requested military supports from Tống Phước Hiệp of Long Hồ. Chaophraya Chakri Mud led the Siamese forces to attack Châu Đốc on the Bassac River, leading to the Battle of Châu Đốc. Tống Phước Hiệp managed to repel the Siamese attacks at Châu Đốc. Chakri Mud and the Siamese lost 300 men in battle and five or eight war-boats to the Vietnamese. The defeated Siamese abandoned their boats and retreated on land.

As King Taksin received the news about the Burmese in the north, he decided to return to Thonburi. He granted ammunitions and rice supplies to Chen Lian at Hà Tiên and to Ang Non at Oudong in order to maintain Siamese position in Cambodia. King Taksin left Hà Tiên on December 24, 1771 along with some members of the Mạc family and other political captives including Prince Chui and Pu Lan the former governor of Chanthaburi. The royal entourage reached Thonburi on January 13, 1772. Prince Chao Chui was later executed at Thonburi.

=== Vietnamese counter-offensives ===
Mạc Thiên Tứ went to Saigon and asked ceremonially for punishments for himself from the Nguyen court. The Nguyen Lord Nguyễn Phúc Thuần provided money and food to Mạc Thiên Tứ. The Ayutthayan Prince Sisang died in February 1772. King Ang Ton of Cambodia moved from Trolong Khoas to Prek Moat Kandar. In February 1772, Nguyễn Phúc Thuần then organized the Vietnamese counter-offensives into Cambodia and Hà Tiên in order to restore Mạc Thiên Tứ, who had been a vassal to the Nguyen court, in three routes as follows;

- Nguyễn Cửu Đàm, with the title of Đàm Ưng hầu, would lead the armies along the Mekong.
- Nguyễn Khoa Thuyên would lead the armies from Rạch Giá and Sa Đéc to attack by sea.
- Nguyễn Hữu Nhơn, with the title of Nhơn Thanh hầu, would lead the fleet of 1,000 men and 50 warships along the Bassac River.

Mạc Thiên Tứ spent the time of exile in Cần Thơ. It took five months for the Nguyen court to assemble armies and began marching in July 1772. The Vietnamese fleet attacked Hà Tiên by sea. Chen Lian, the Siam-appointed governor of Hà Tiên, was unprepared. The battle of Hà Tiên occurred for three hours with the Vietnamese prevailing and Chen Lian ended up fleeing Hà Tiên to take refuge in Kampot. Oknha Panglima the governor of Kampot provided Chen Lian with shelter and military forces. In three days, Chen Lian managed to raise a fleet from Kampot to attack Hà Tiên at night. Forces of Chen Lian ambushed the port of Hà Tiên and took the city back from the Vietnamese.

On the Bassac front, the Vietnamese commander Nguyễn Hữu Nhơn fell ill and left the commands to his subordinate Hiến Chương hầu. The Vietnamese was defeated in Bassac and retreated to Cần Thơ.

Nguyễn Cửu Đàm sent the Cambodian commander Oknha Yumreach Tol to lead the vanguard of 10,000 men to attack Chaophraya Chakri at Peam Panca Peas (in modern Prey Veng). Chaophraya Chakri Mud was defeated and Oknha Yumreach Tol seized Phnom Penh, prompting the pro-Siamese Ang Non to flee to Kampot. In mid-1772, King Ang Ton moved from Prek Moat Kandar to Khleang Sbaek. The Cambodian king Ang Ton resumed his rule over most of Cambodia, with the exception of the southwestern towns, including Kampot, Kampong Som and Bati, which were under the control of Ang Non. Ang Non received the forces of 500 men from Siam at his disposal at Kampot. Ang Non then marched his forces to Peam Roka to the south of Phnom Penh. Oknha Yumreach Tol attacked Ang Non at Peam Roka.

Chen Lian reported the events of Vietnamese offensive campaign to Thonburi. Next year, in February 1773, Nguyễn Phúc Thuần ordered Mạc Thiên Tứ to send a mission to Taksin to seek for peace. Taksin cordially accepted the friendly gesture from Mạc Thiên Tứ and returned a wife and a daughter to Mạc Thiên Tứ. King Taksin decided that the Siamese hold on Cambodia and Hà Tiên was untenable. He then ordered the withdrawal of Siamese occupation troops from Cambodia and Hà Tiên. In March 1773, Chen Lian organized the remaining inhabitants of Hà Tiên on ships to be deported to Thonburi as he left the city. Phraya Yommarat also retreated from Cambodia, taking 10,000 Cambodian captives with him back to Thonburi. By March 1773, the Siamese had left Cambodia, so as the Vietnamese and the war came to the end.

Shortly after the Siamese army withdrew from Hà Tiên, Mạc Thiên Tứ retook his former principality. The actions of the Nguyễn Lords during these times helped to provoke and fuel internal rebellion in Vietnam, (the Tây Sơn Rebellion) which would eventually sweep them out of power.

Despite the fact that King Taksin had waged war against the Nguyễn Lords he gave refuge and shelter to some Vietnamese refugees during the Tây Sơn Rebellion, primarily Nguyễn-loyalist mandarins and generals. One of these refugees was Mạc Thiên Tứ, the former governor of Hà Tiên, who was awarded the Siamese rank and title of Phraya Rachasethi Yuan. King Taksin executed some Vietnamese refugees, and exiled others to distant borders.

== Aftermath ==
=== Tây Sơn uprising ===
The Tây Sơn uprising began in 1771, the same year that King Taksin invaded Hà Tiên, in the Tây Sơn district under the leaderships of three Tây Sơn brothers – Nguyễn Nhạc, Nguyễn Lữ and Nguyễn Huệ, against the rule of the Nguyễn lords. In 1773, Nguyễn Nhạc led the Tây Sơn to successfully seize control of Quy Nhơn. The Trinh Lord Trịnh Sâm of Tonkin marched from Northern Vietnam to seize Huế, which was the power center of the Nguyễn Lords. The Nguyễn Lord Nguyễn Phúc Thuần and his whole Nguyen court fled to seek refuge at Saigon in the south. In 1777, Nguyễn Huệ of the Tây Sơn attacked and seized Saigon, prompting Nguyễn Phúc Thuần to seek shelter with Mạc Thiên Tứ at Cần Thơ. Mạc Thiên Tứ sent his son Mạc Tử Dung to fight against Nguyễn Huệ but was defeated. Mạc Thiên Tứ then took Nguyễn Phúc Thuần to Long Xuyên. However, Nguyễn Huệ followed to Long Xuyên, capturing Nguyễn Phúc Thuần and bringing him to be executed at Saigon. King Taksin, upon learning about the Tây Sơn uprising, sent his delegate to meet with Mạc Thiên Tứ in Cochinchina, suggesting his former enemy to take safety refuge in Thonburi. Mạc Thiên Tứ, by that point, was fearful of the power of the Siamese king and agreed to move to Thonburi along with the Mạc family and Tôn Thất Xuân (who was known in Thai sources as Ong Chieng Chun Thai: องเชียงชุน, from ông chánh Xuân), a member of the Nguyen clan.

Mạc Thiên Tứ and his family stayed in Thonburi for three years until 1780. In 1780, Preah Ang Keav, the Cambodian delegate, informed King Taksin about a letter from Nguyễn Ánh, the new Nguyen Lord who had been in Saigon resisting the Tây Sơn, to Tôn Thất Xuân telling him to insurrect and seize control of Thonburi. Mạc Thiên Tứ, upon learning of this incident, committed suicide. King Taksin then ordered the executions of Tôn Thất Xuân and members of the family of Mạc Thiên Tứ including his wife, his two sons Mạc Tử Hoàng and Mạc Tử Dung, along with other Vietnamese people. The total number of fifty-three Vietnamese were executed on that occasion. Phraya Kalahom beseeched King Taksin to spare the lives of young members of the Mạc family including the young sons of Mạc Thiên Tứ: Mạc Tử Sinh, Mạc Tử Tuấn, Mạc Tử Thiêm and three young sons of Mạc Tử Hoàng. Mạc Tử Sinh was later appointed by Siam as the governor of Hà Tiên in the 1780s.

=== Subsequent events in Cambodia ===
Ultimately as the proxy war continued, Cambodia deteriorated into lawlessness. Cambodian governors ceased paying their taxes. Cambodians died due to starvation and cholera. In 1772, King Ang Ton of Cambodia realized that conflicts with his rival Ang Non, which led to the wider Siamese-Vietnamese conflicts, had caused hardships, famine and loss of lives in Cambodia. Ang Ton then decided to negotiate and reconcile with his rival Ang Non and with Siam. Furthermore, the preoccupation of the Nguyen regime with the Tây Sơn uprising meant that Ang Ton would receive less support from the Vietnamese. In 1773, Ang Ton sent Preah Ang Keav as his delegate to Thonburi to seek for peace. However, Taksin distrusted Ang Ton so he ordered Preah Ang Keav imprisoned. Preah Ang Keav proved his sincere intentions by having his own family from Cambodia to join him in Thonburi. Taksin was then convinced and released Preah Ang Keav from prison.

In 1774, Ang Ton decided that he should abdicate in favor of Ang Non in order to placate Siamese aggression. Next year, in 1775, Ang Ton sent the Cambodian Sangharaja to invite Ang Non from Kampot to Oudong. Ang Ton abdicated, for the sake of peace, and Ang Non was enthroned as the new king Reameathiptei of Cambodia. Ang Ton received the title of Uprayorach or Moha Uphayoreac or second king instead. Another prince, Ang Tham, was made Ouparach or third king. However, in 1777, the prince Ouparach Ang Tham was murdered and, in the same year, Ang Ton fell ill and died. This left Ang Non in sole, absolute power in Cambodia.

In 1778, King Taksin of Thonburi initiated a grand campaign to subjugate Lao kingdoms. Chaophraya Chakri (King Rama I) sent his younger brother Chaophraya Surasi (Prince Maha Sura Singhanat) to Cambodia in order to recruit Cambodian forces into the war against Vientiane. Ang Non ordered troops and rice supply to be levied from Cambodia and sent them to join the war on behalf of Siam. This led to dissatisfactions among Cambodian peasants. Uprisings and upheavals commenced against Ang Non as he ordered Chauvea Tolaha Mu (Khmer: ចៅហ្វាទឡ្ហៈមូ, Thai: เจ้าฟ้าทะละหะ (มู)) to suppress dissentions. However, Tolaha Mu and other Cambodian nobles had been suspicious that Ang Non was responsible for the deaths of the late princes Ang Ton and Ang Tham. Tolaha Mu then decided to turn against Ang Non. Tolaha Mu requested supports from Nguyễn Ánh, who had been in Saigon waging wars with the Tây Sơn. Nguyễn Ánh sent Vietnamese forces under Đỗ Thanh Nhơn to defeat King Ang Non in 1779. Ang Non was captured and executed by drowning at Khayong Pond. His four sons were also killed. Tolaha Mu then made the seven-year-old Prince Ang Eng, a son of Ang Ton, as the new young king of Cambodia as his puppet, while Tolaha Mu himself wielded actual powers as the prime minister and the regent. The Cambodian court then became pro-Vietnamese again.

In 1781, Taksin initiated an invasion of Cambodia with an army of 20,000 under the command of Somdej Chao Phraya Mahakasatsuek. It is uncertain, but King Taksin's ultimate goal may have been to place his son, Prince Intarapitak, on the Cambodian throne, effectively annexing Cambodia to Siam. Before any fighting occurred however, disturbances in Siam caused the Siamese army to return to Thonburi.

=== Sino–Siamese relations ===
After the destruction Hà Tiên of at the hands of the Siamese and the deaths of Ayutthayan princes, the Qing court of Beijing took an improved attitude towards Taksin. Taksin sent his Chinese merchants Chen Fusheng and Chen Wansheng as royal delegates to Guangzhou in 1774 and 1775, respectively, in order to request to buy saltpeter to be used in Burmese Wars. In 1777, Li Shiyao, the viceroy of Liangguang, expressed his opinion to Emperor Qianlong that Taksin was a formidable opponent of Burma, which was an enemy of China. In July 1777, Taksin sent three delegates to Yang Jingsu, the new viceroy of Liangguang, expressing his wish to offer tributes to China according to the usual ceremonial practices. Qianlong responded by instructing Yang Jingsu to keep the door open for Taksin's prospective missions. Also in 1777, the Chinese court used the term Wang (王) or "King", for the first time, in referring to Taksin. This is interpreted as the unofficial recognition of Taksin as the ruler of Siam in the Chinese tributary network. However, Taksin's goal in traditional tributary relations with China was not the conferral of legitimate title, for he had already secured his throne, but recognition and permission to engage in tributary trade with China, which was a lucrative income for the Siamese court. Next year, in 1778, Taksin sent a letter to the Qing court requesting to postpone sending tributes because Siam was suffering from the impact of the Burmese Invasions of 1775–1776.

Taksin sent his first full-fledge official mission under Chinese tributary system and his last mission to China in May 1781. When the envoys returned to Siam in April 1782, the regime had already changed. Siam was only officially invested by the Qing court and given the Lokto (駱駝) seal in 1787 in the reign of King Rama I.

== See also ==
- Siamese–Vietnamese wars
- Battle of Rạch Gầm-Xoài Mút
- Cambodian rebellion (1811–1812)
- Siamese–Vietnamese War (1831–1834)
- Siamese–Vietnamese War (1841–1845)
