= Mekong Delta =

Delta of the Mekong River at its mouth in southern Vietnam

Mekong Delta Đồng bằng Sông Cửu Long Đồng Bằng Sông Mê Kông
- Region
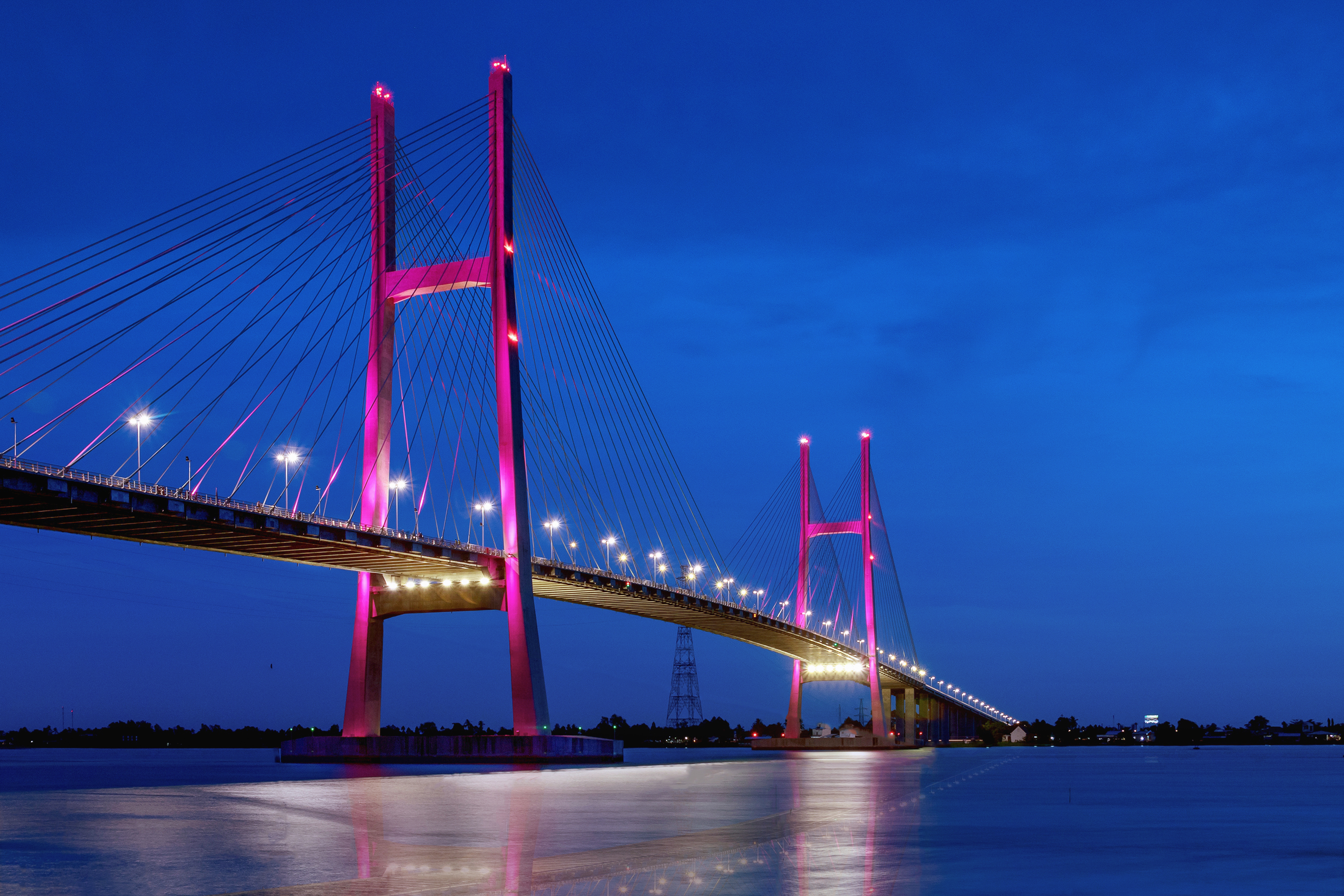
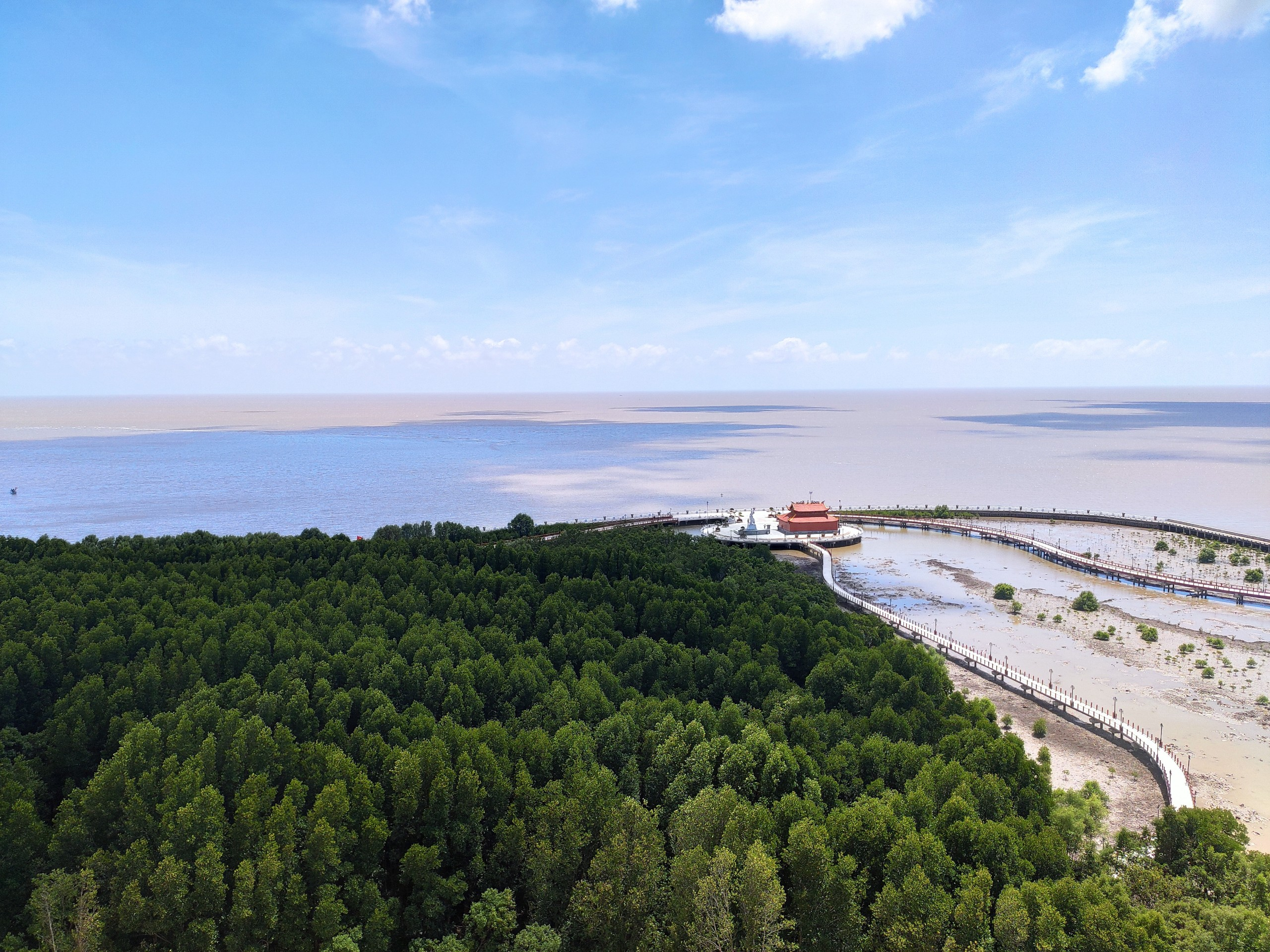
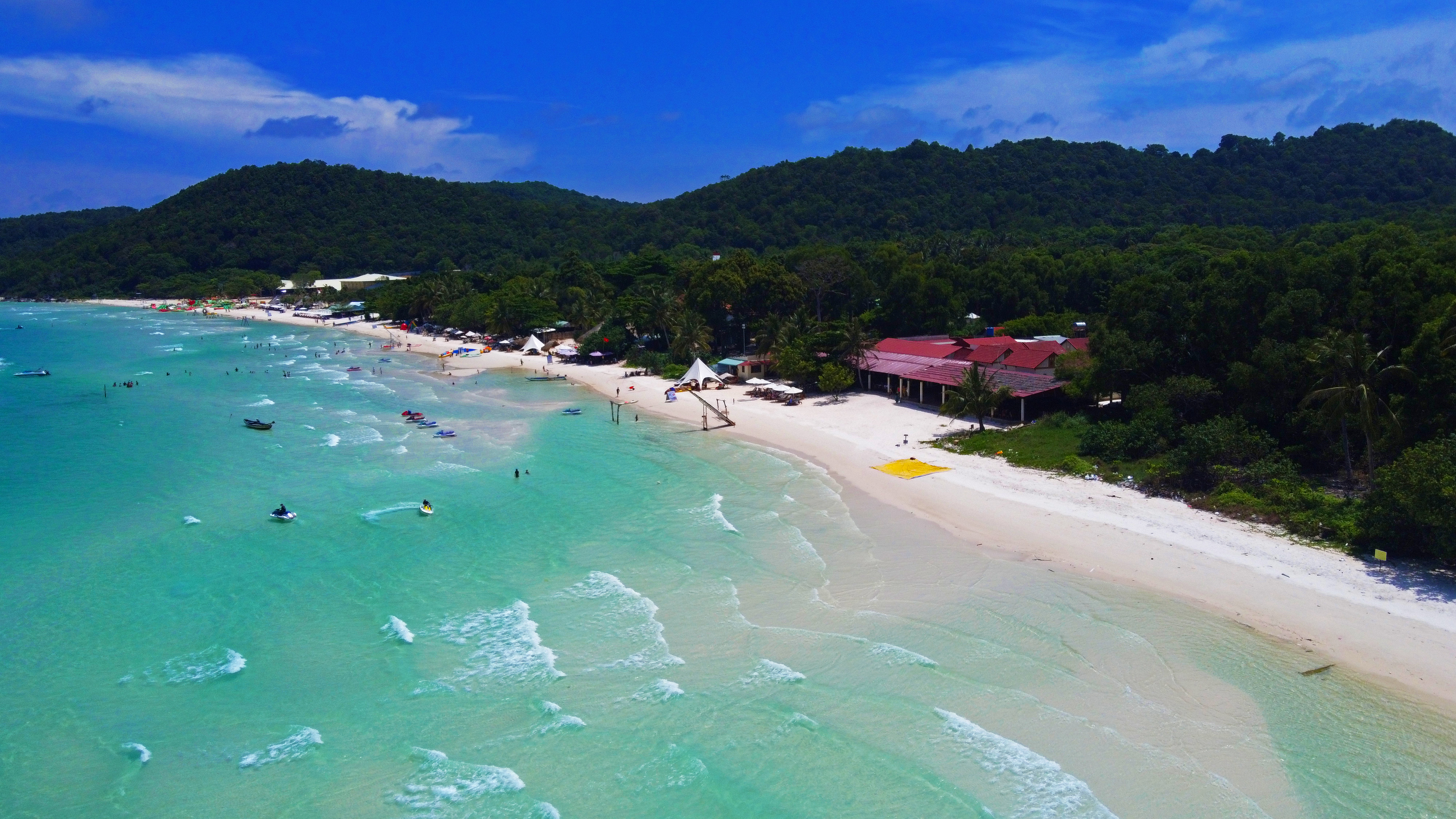
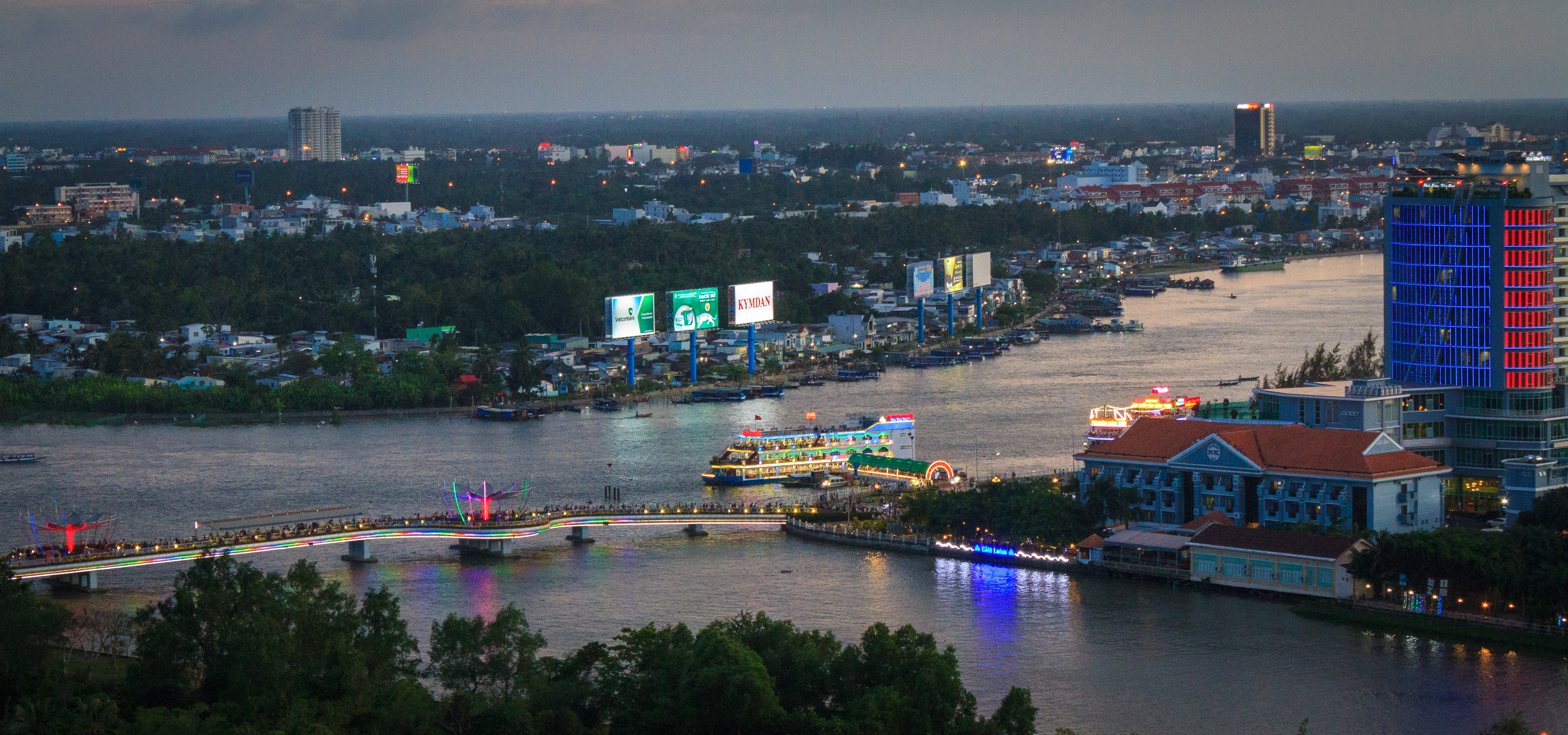
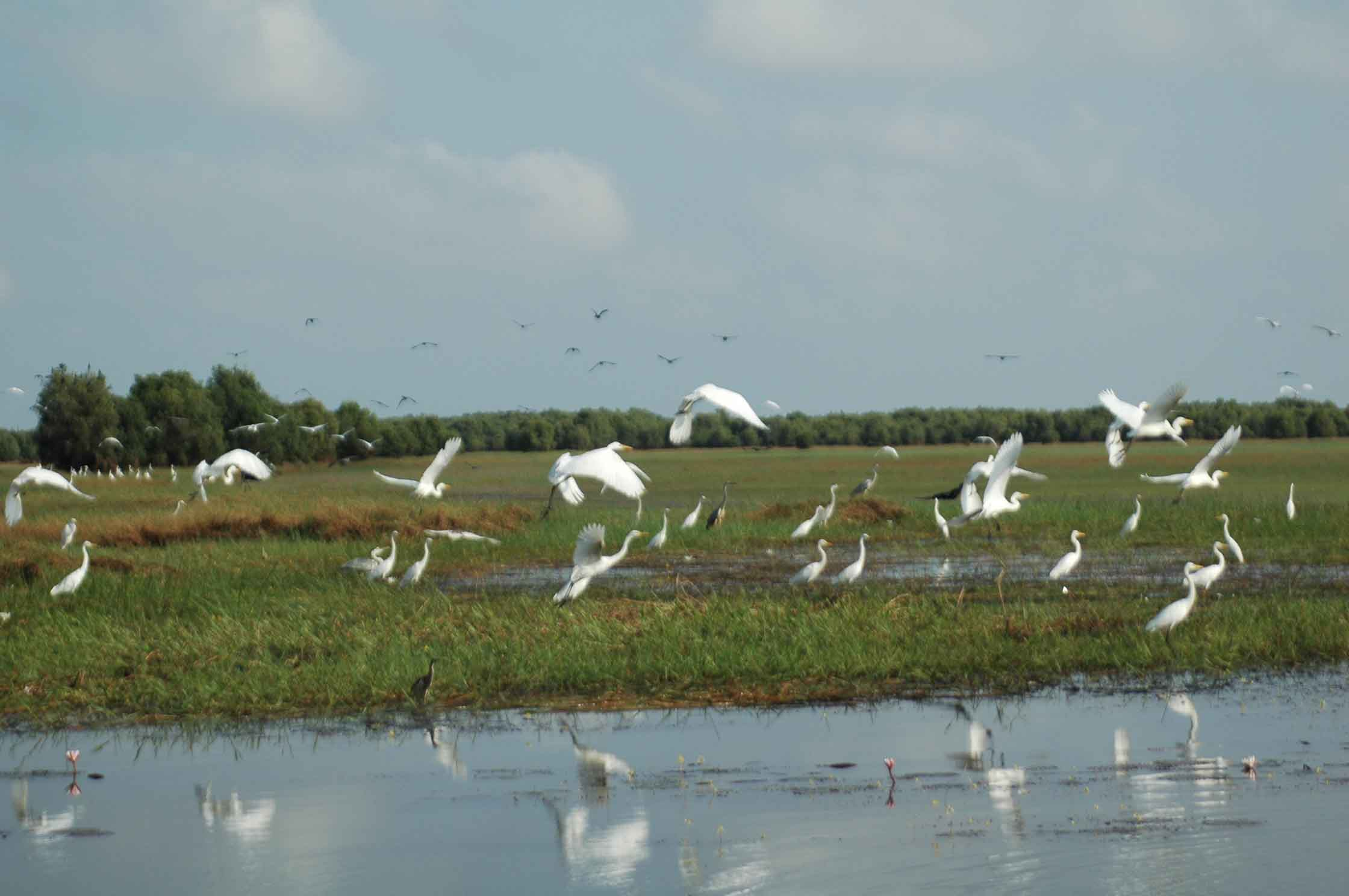
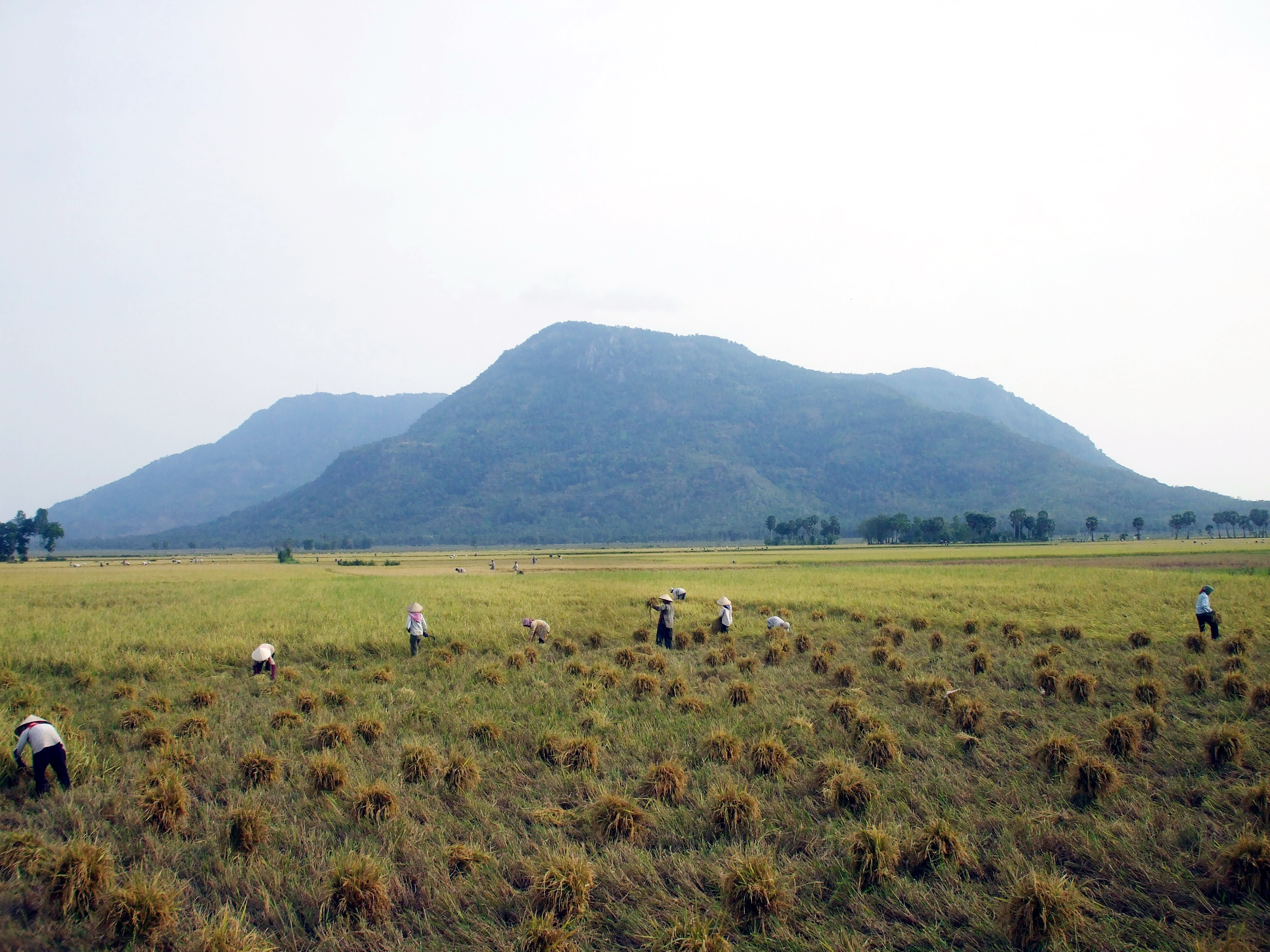
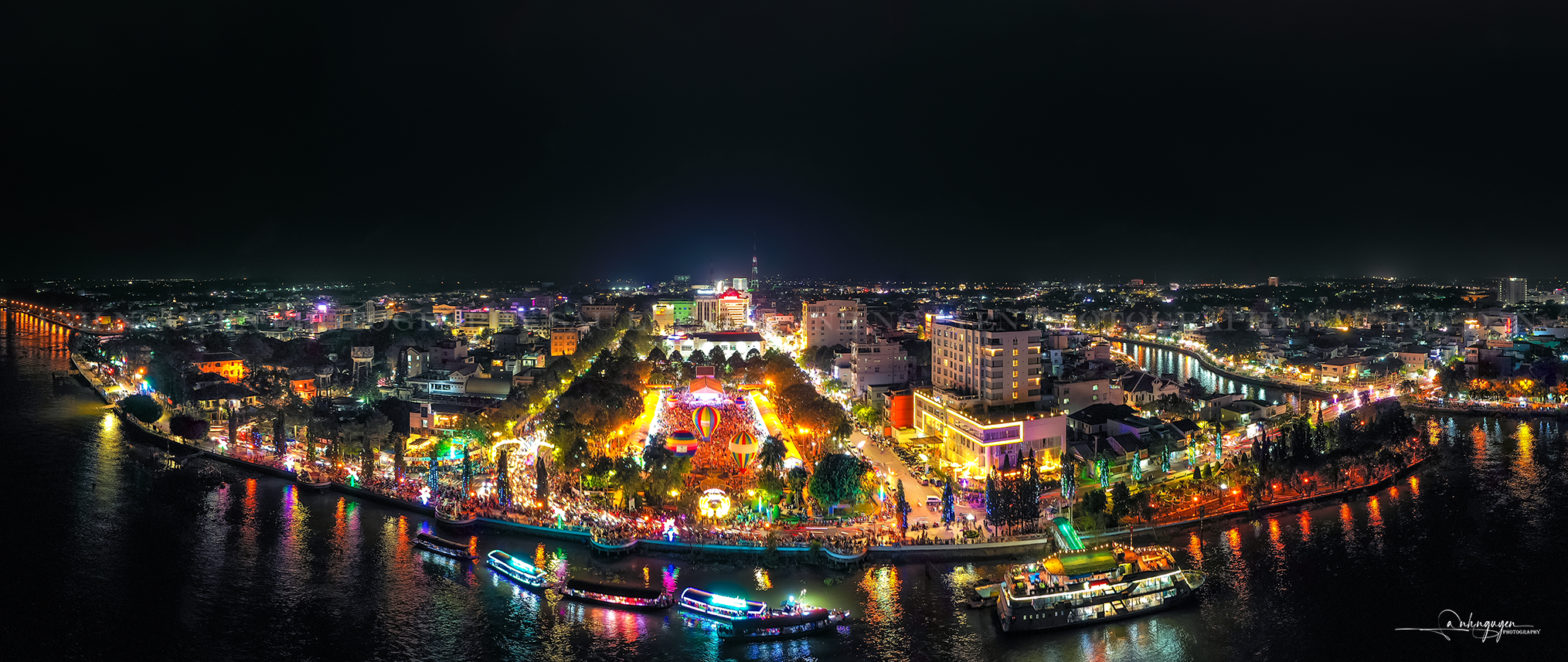
- Cao Lanh Bridge Ca Mau Cape Sao Beach, Phu Quoc Island Can Tho City Tram Chim National Park Cam Mountain Vinh Long Province
- Nicknames: "Nine Dragon river delta", "Western Region"
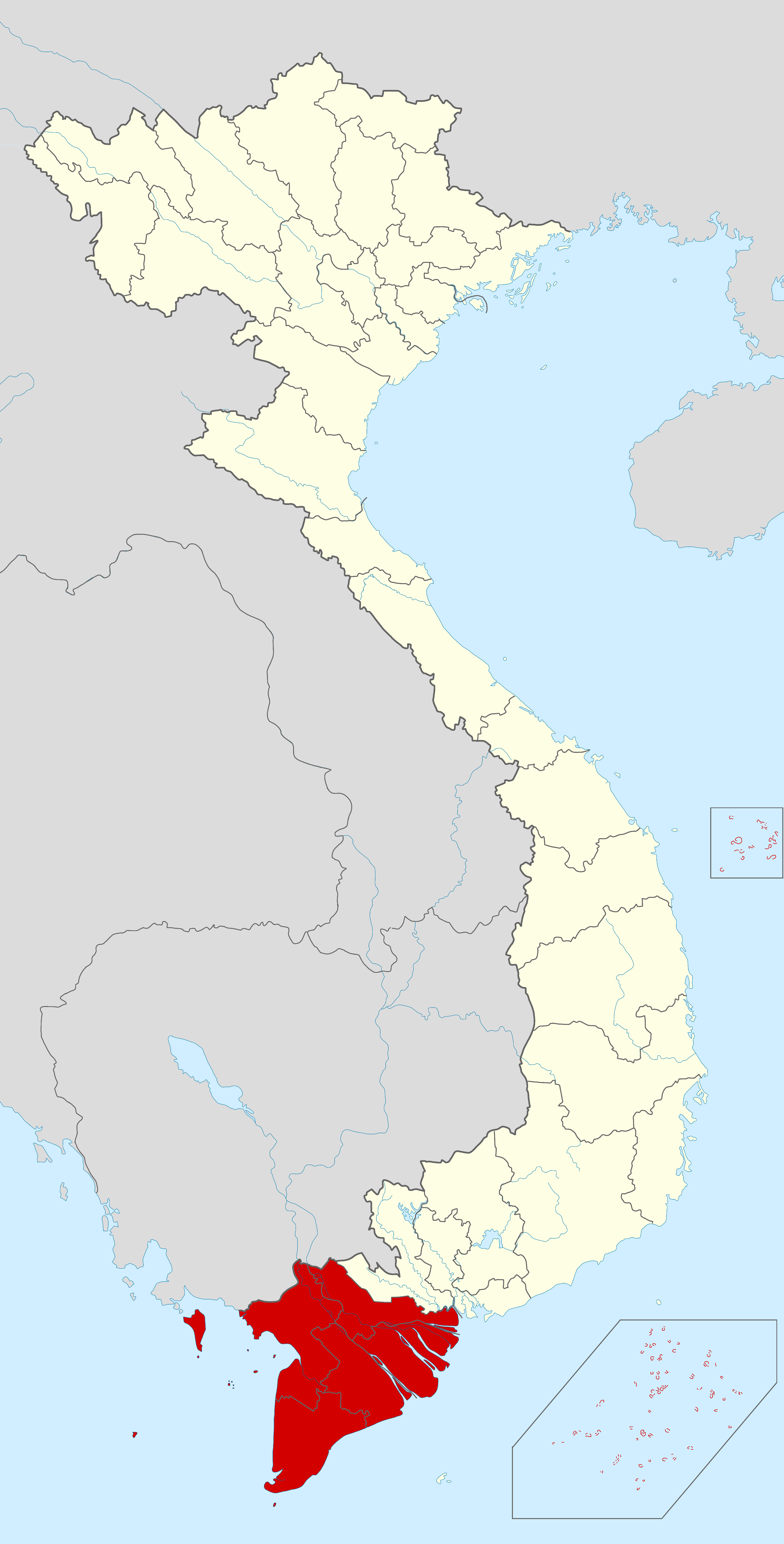
- Provincial map
- Coordinates: 10.04°N 105.80°E
- Country: Vietnam
- Largest City: Can Tho

Area
  - Total: 43,000 km^{2} (17,000 sq mi)

Population (2022)
  - Total: 19,000,000
  - Density: 440/km^{2} (1,100/sq mi)

GDP
  - Total: VND 823 trillion US$36.2 billion (2021)
- Time zone: UTC+07:00 (ICT)
- HDI (2022): 0.684 high · 5th

The Mekong Delta, also known as the South-western Region (Vietnamese: Tây Nam Bộ) or the Western Region (Vietnamese: Miền Tây), is the region in southwestern Vietnam where the Mekong River approaches and empties into the sea through a network of distributaries. The Mekong delta region encompasses a large portion of south-western Vietnam, of an area of over 40,500 km^{2} (15,600 sq mi). The size of the area covered by water depends on the season. Its wet coastal geography makes it an important source of agriculture and aquaculture for the country.

The delta has been occupied as early as the 4th century BC. As a product of Khmer, Vietnamese, Chinese, and French settlement in the region, the delta and its waterways have numerous names, including the Khmer term Bassac to refer to the lower basin and the largest river branch flowing through it. After the 1954 Geneva Conference, Vietnam was split into two with South Vietnam inheriting the southern half of Vietnam becoming the State of Vietnam and eventually the Republic of Vietnam, also known as South Vietnam, with their own administrative states (see Category:Provinces of South Vietnam). After 1975, the Mekong Delta ceased being a part of the Republic of Vietnam, succeeded by the current Vietnamese nation. The region comprises 4 provinces: Đồng Tháp, An Giang, Vĩnh Long, and Cà Mau, along with the province-level municipality of Cần Thơ.

The Mekong Delta has been dubbed a "biological treasure trove". Over 1,000 animal species were recorded between 1997 and 2007 and new species of plants, fish, lizards, and mammals have been discovered in previously unexplored areas, including the Laotian rock rat, member of a family thought to have been extinct for 11 million years. The low-lying coastal geography of the region makes it vulnerable to climate change caused sea level rise, alongside related issues such as coastal erosion and saltwater intrusion.

== History ==
=== Funan and Chenla period ===
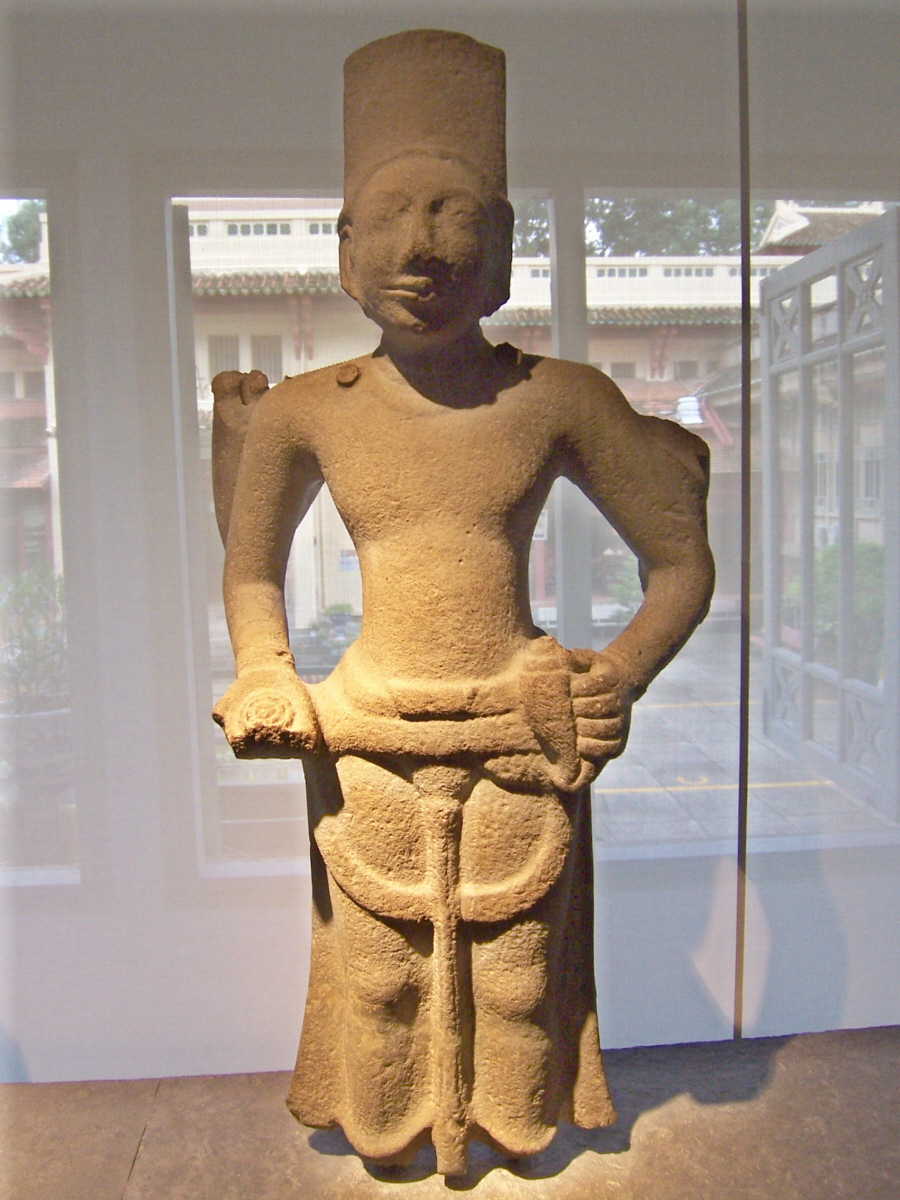
A statue of the Hindu god Vishnu found at Óc Eo (6–7th century AD).

The Mekong Delta was likely inhabited long since prehistory with the civilizations of Funan and Chenla maintaining a presence in the Mekong Delta for centuries. Archaeological discoveries at Óc Eo and other Funanese sites show that the area was an important part of the Funan civilization, bustling with trading ports and canals as early as in the first century AD and extensive human settlement in the region may have gone as far back as the 4th century BC. While there is no clear consensus on the ethnic makeup of those living in the region during the Funan, archaeologists suggest that they may have had connections to Austroasiatic people. Khmer inscriptions appear during the Chenla period.

Angkor Borei is a site in the Mekong Delta that existed between 400 BC-500 AD. This site had extensive maritime trade networks throughout Southeast Asia and with India, and is believed to have possibly been the ancient capital to the civilization of Funan.

=== Champa incursions ===
In the early 15th century, Champa began mounting several incursions in the Mekong Delta. The declining Kingdom of Cambodia asked the Chinese Ming Empire for intervention in 1408 and 1414. Despite that, in 1421 Indravarman VI of Champa commemorated his victory over the Khmer and installed a statue of Tribhuvanākrānta (Visnu) in Bien Hoa. In 1757, Vietnamese lords had acquired control of Cà Mau. By the 1860s, French colonists had established control over the Mekong Delta and established the colony of French Cochinchina.

=== Vietnamese period ===
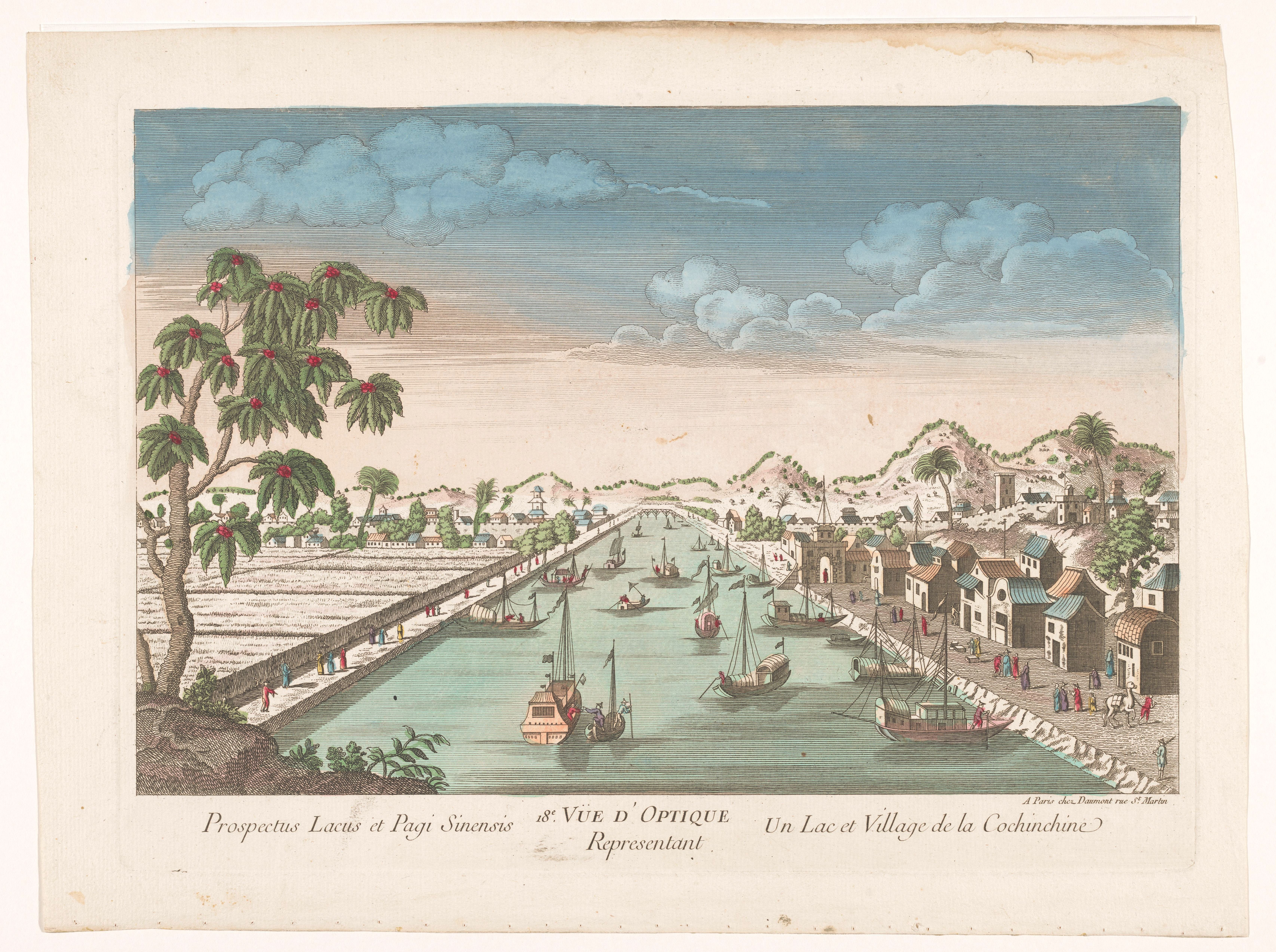
Scene of a Mekong Delta town in 18th century. Watercolour lithograph by Jean-François Daumont, circa 1760.

The Vietnamese acquisition of the Mekong Delta can be divided into two phases:

==== Marriage agreement and interventions ====
In 1621, Lord Nguyễn Phúc Nguyên arranged a contract marriage between his daughter Nguyễn Phúc Ngọc Vạn and Cambodian king Chey Chettha II in exchange to the establishment of a Vietnamese trade port in town of Prei Nokor (now Ho Chi Minh City) and tax exemptions for Vietnamese settlers moving into the area. Vice versa, the Nguyễn will help Cambodia politically and militarily to counter against Ayutthaya Kingdom (Siamese) pressures. Earliest Vietnamese settlements in the Mekong Delta appeared and centered around Đồng Nai and Mỗi Xoài (today east of Ho Chi Minh City).

In 1658, without any excuses, the Nguyễn invaded Cambodia and deposed the only Khmer Muslim king Ramathipadi I (Sultan Ibrahim). 16 years later, the Nguyễn again militarily interfered Cambodian internal royal affairs, putting Prince Ang Nan into power. The Nguyễn invited fleeing Chinese refugees to settle in Mekong River entrance towns of Mỹ Tho and Biên Hoà In 1688, the Chinese revolted against Nguyễn lords. King Ang Nan died in 1691, and the revolt was soon resolved.

After fully subjugating Champa in 1697, the Nguyễn lords sent marquis Nguyễn Hữu Cảnh and a small expedition to annex Prei Nokor, renamed it to Gia Định, establishing Vietnamese administrative structures, and explore deep into the lower Mekong Delta from Mỹ Tho to An Giang. King Chey Chettha IV of Cambodia tried to stop the Vietnamese but was defeated by Nguyễn Hữu Cảnh in 1700. In February 1700, he invaded Cambodia from An Giang. In March, the Vietnamese expedition under Cảnh and a Chinese general Trần Thượng Xuyên (Chen Shangchuan) defeated the main Cambodian army at Bích Đôi citadel, king Chey Chettha IV took flight while his nephew Ang Em surrendered to the invaders as the Vietnamese captured Phnom Penh. As a result, Saigon and Long An were officially obtained by the Nguyễn, more Vietnamese settlers moved into the new conquered lands. In 1708, Mạc Cửu of Hà Tiên also pledged loyalty to the Nguyễn lords.

==== Conquest of the Mekong Delta ====
In the 18th century, the edges of the Mekong Delta bordering with Cambodia had been mainly inhabited by isolated communities of Shafi'i Chams and Islamic Cham–Malays collectively known as the Cham Barw or Côn Man (Kunlun) by Vietnamese sources, while most of the Delta remained under Cambodian control. Under the reign of king Chey Chettha V, in 1750 he began subduing and persecuting the Cham–Malay Muslims, who at the time were close allies of the Nguyễn lords. Using that pretext, Lord Nguyễn Phúc Khoát launched a full-scale invasion of Cambodia in 1754, with the army under the command of general Nguyễn Cư Trinh. 10,000 Vietnamese troops divided into two groups, rolled into Cambodia and completely flattened Cambodian resistance and easily captured its capital Phnom Penh in summer of 1754. King Chey Chettha V fled to Longvek.

The Muslims rose up and joined the Vietnamese chasing the Cambodians. Due to heavy spring rain, the Muslim segment lost contact with the main army of Nguyễn Cư Trinh, and were surrounded by 10,000 Cambodians at Vô Tà Ân in early 1755. Muslim troops piled carts and wagons into a defensive perimeter and stood their ground against Cambodian attacks until being relieved by Nguyễn Cư Trinh. With the help of mediation by Mạc Thiên Tứ of Hà Tiên, a ceasefire agreement was reached between King Chey Chettha V and Lord Nguyễn Phúc Khoát in 1756: Cambodia ceded Gò Công and Tân An to the Vietnamese, Chey Chettha V was deposed, while Ang Tong was restored as King of Cambodia. Ang Tong offered the Nguyễn two districts of Trà Vinh and Ba Thắc as tributes.

In 1757, Ang Tong died and was succeeded Outey II. With the help of the Nguyễn Lords and the Principality of Hà Tiên, Outey II regained the throne from usurpers. He gave all remaining Mekong Delta lands to Mạc Thiên Tứ, and Mạc Thiên Tứ swapped all these areas to the Nguyễn in exchange for the Mạc clan's total autonomy in Hà Tiên. The new lands were divided into two districts: Rạch Giá and Cà Mau. By 1757, all of today's Mekong Delta including the Cape Cà Mau firmly came under Vietnamese control.

==== Nguyễn dynasty, French and modern period ====
In 1802 Nguyễn Ánh crowned himself emperor Gia Long and unified all the territories comprising modern Vietnam, including the Mekong Delta.

Upon the conclusion of the Cochinchina Campaign in the 1860s, the area became part of Cochinchina, France's first colony in Vietnam, and later, part of French Indochina. Beginning during the French colonial period, the French patrolled and fought on the waterways of the Mekong Delta region with their Divisions navales d'assaut (Dinassaut), a tactic which lasted throughout the First Indochina War, and was later employed by the US Navy Mobile Riverine Force. During the Vietnam War—also referred to as the Second Indochina War—the Delta region saw savage fighting between Viet Cong (NLF) guerrillas and the US 9th Infantry Division and units of the United States Navy's swift boats and hovercraft (PACVs) plus the Army of the Republic of Vietnam 7th, 9th, and 21st Infantry Divisions. As a military region the Mekong Delta was encompassed by the IV Corps Tactical Zone (IV CTZ).

In 1975, North Vietnamese soldiers and Viet Cong soldiers launched a massive invasion in many parts of South Vietnam. While I, II, and III Corps collapsed significantly, IV Corps was still highly intact due to under Major General Nguyễn Khoa Nam overseeing strong military operations to prevent VC taking over any important regional districts. Brigadier General Lê Văn Hưng, the head of 21st Division commander, stayed office in Cần Thơ to continue defending successfully against VC. On 29 April 1975, the last U.S. Consul General Terry McNamara and his diplomats evacuated by marine boat from Cần Thơ to the South China Sea. When the South Vietnamese President Dương Văn Minh ordered unconditional surrender, both ARVN generals in Cần Thơ, General Lê Văn Hưng and Nguyễn Khoa Nam, committed suicide. At Binh Thuy Air Base some ARVN soldiers and air base personnel who defended the air base were evacuated by helicopters and several jet fighters to Thailand shortly after hearing Minh's surrender. Within hours, VC soldiers occupied the base and captured those ARVN and air base personnel who didn't escape. In Mỹ Tho, Brigadier General Trần Văn Hai, who was in charged protecting National Highway 4 (now NH1A) from Saigon to Cần Thơ, committed suicide. Tran was one of the three ARVN generals who refused to be evacuated by American forces when the North Vietnamese soldiers invaded Saigon. Several ARVN soldiers continued to fight against the VC but later either surrendered or disbanded when faced with VC counterattacks.

In the late 1970s, the Khmer Rouge regime attacked Vietnam in an attempt to reconquer the Delta region. This campaign precipitated the Vietnamese invasion of Cambodia and subsequent downfall of the Khmer Rouge.

== Geography ==
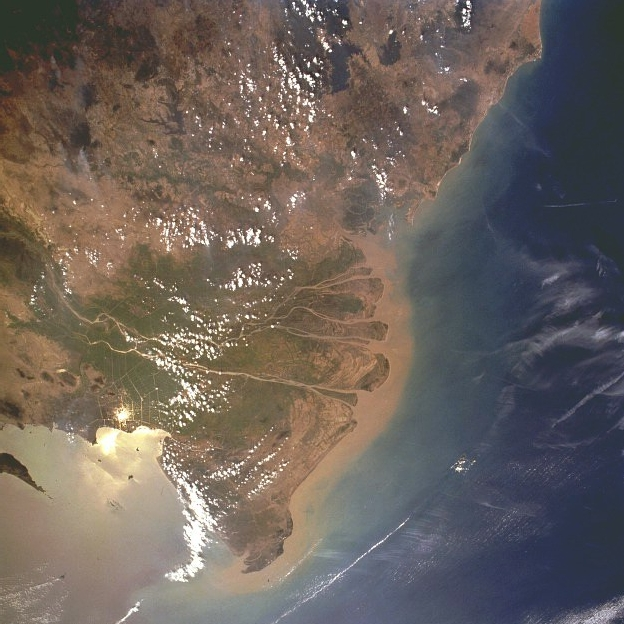
Mekong River Delta from space, February 1996.

The Mekong Delta, as a region, lies immediately to the west of Ho Chi Minh City (also called Saigon by locals), roughly forming a triangle stretching from Mỹ Tho in the east to Châu Đốc and Hà Tiên in the northwest, down to Cà Mau at the southernmost tip of Vietnam, and including the island of Phú Quốc.

The Mekong Delta region of Vietnam displays a variety of physical landscapes, but is dominated by flat flood plains in the south, with a few hills in the north and west. This diversity of terrain was largely the product of tectonic uplift and folding brought about by the collision of the Indian and Eurasian tectonic plates about 50 million years ago. The soil of the lower Delta consists mainly of sediment from the Mekong and its tributaries, deposited over thousands of years as the river changed its course due to the flatness of the low-lying terrain.

The present Mekong Delta system has two major distributary channels, both discharging directly into the East Sea. The river carries over 160 million tons of sediment, including 6.5 million tons of sand, each year. Historic sediment loads are estimated to be higher, but have been reduced due to damming for hydropower in the upper reaches of the Mekong River Basin, and sand mining in the riverbed. Sediment is the driving factor in building the delta seaward (progradation), and upward (aggradation) from seasonal flooding, and is counteracted by coastal erosion and sea level rise.

The Holocene history of the Mekong Delta shows delta progradation of about 200 km during the last 6 kyr. During the Middle Holocene the Mekong River was discharging waters into both the East Sea and the Gulf of Thailand. The water entering the Gulf of Thailand was flowing via a palaeochannel located within the western part of the delta; north of the Camau Peninsula. Upper Pleistocene prodeltaic and delta front sediments interpreted as the deposits of the palaeo-Mekong River were reported from central basin of the Gulf of Thailand.

The Mekong Delta is the region with the smallest forest area in Vietnam. 300,000 ha (740,000 acres) or 7.7% of the total area are forested as of 2011. The only provinces with large forests are Cà Mau and An Giang, together accounting for two-thirds of the region's forest area, while forests cover less than 5% of the area of all of the other eight provinces and cities.

=== Coastal erosion ===
	Shoreline change (m/yr)					
Zones	1973–1979	1973–1979	1987–1995	1987–1995	1987–1995	43-yr average
Zone-1	8.66	8.07	12.07	9.68	4.52	8.87
Zone-2	−10.32	−8.00	−12.22	−13.15	−20.9	−12.79
Zone-3	28.15	23.33	27.55	19.48	11.83	21.53
Zone-4	8.43	2.48	3.57	−10.03	−4.53	−1.66
All areas	7.77	6.11	7.84	2.75	−1.42	4.36

	Area change (km^{2}/yr)					
Zones	1973–1979	1973–1979	1987–1995	1987–1995	1987–1995	43-yr average
Zone-1	1.94	2.01	2.96	2.25	1.15	2.12
Zone-2	−1.39	−1.87	−2.23	−1.75	−1.71	−1.71
Zone-3	2.82	2.16	1.71	1.09	1.64	1.99
Zone-4	0.95	0.35	−0.53	−0.56	−1.13	−0.18
All areas	4.32	2.64	1.91	1.03	−0.05	2.23

From 1973 to 2005, the Mekong Delta's seaward shoreline growth decreased gradually from a mean of 7.8 m/yr to 2.8 m/yr, becoming negative after 2005, with a retreat rate of −1.4 m/yr. The net deltaic land area gain has also been slowing, with the mean rate decreasing from 4.3 km^{2}/yr (1973–1979) to 1.0 km^{2} yr (1995–2005), and then to −0.05 km^{2}/yr (2005–2015). Thus, in about 2005, the subaerial Mekong Delta transitioned from a constructive mode to an erosional (or destructive) mode.

=== Climate change concerns ===
Being a low-lying coastal region, the Mekong Delta is particularly susceptible to floods resulting from rises in sea level due to climate change. The Climate Change Research Institute at Cần Thơ University, in studying the possible consequences of climate change, has predicted that, besides suffering from drought brought on by seasonal decrease in rainfall, many provinces in the Mekong Delta face risk of flooding by the year 2030. Plans are currently being made to breach dykes in the upper Mekong delta, as a sedimentation enhancing strategy. This will not only increase the water retention capacity of the upper delta region, alleviating pressure on the lower delta, but also reintroduce sediment-rich water which may result in land elevation. Another problem caused by climate change is the increasing soil salinity near the coasts. Bến Tre province is planning to reforest coastal regions to counter this trend.

The duration of inundations at an important road in the city of Cần Thơ is expected to continue to rise from the current total of 72 inundated days per year to 270 days by 2030 and 365 days by 2050. This is attributed to the combined influence of sea-level rise and land subsidence, which occurs at about 1.1 cm (0.43 in) annually. Several projects and initiatives on local, regional and state levels work to counter this trend and save the Mekong Delta. For example, there exists a programme for integrated coastal management that is supported by Germany and Australia. Additionally, international and local initiatives, including significant environmental funding and legislation like Resolution 120 in 2017, emphasize sustainable management and conservation of natural resources, focusing on nature-based solutions such as retrofitting dikes, mangrove restoration, and multi-value farming to mitigate environmental degradation.

In August 2019, a Nature Communications study using an improved measure of elevation estimation, found that the delta was much lower than previous estimates, only a mean 0.82 m (2 ft 8 in) above sea level, with 75% of the delta—an area where 12 million people currently live—falling below 1 m (3 ft 3 in). It is expected that a majority of the delta will be below sea level by 2050.

== Demographics ==
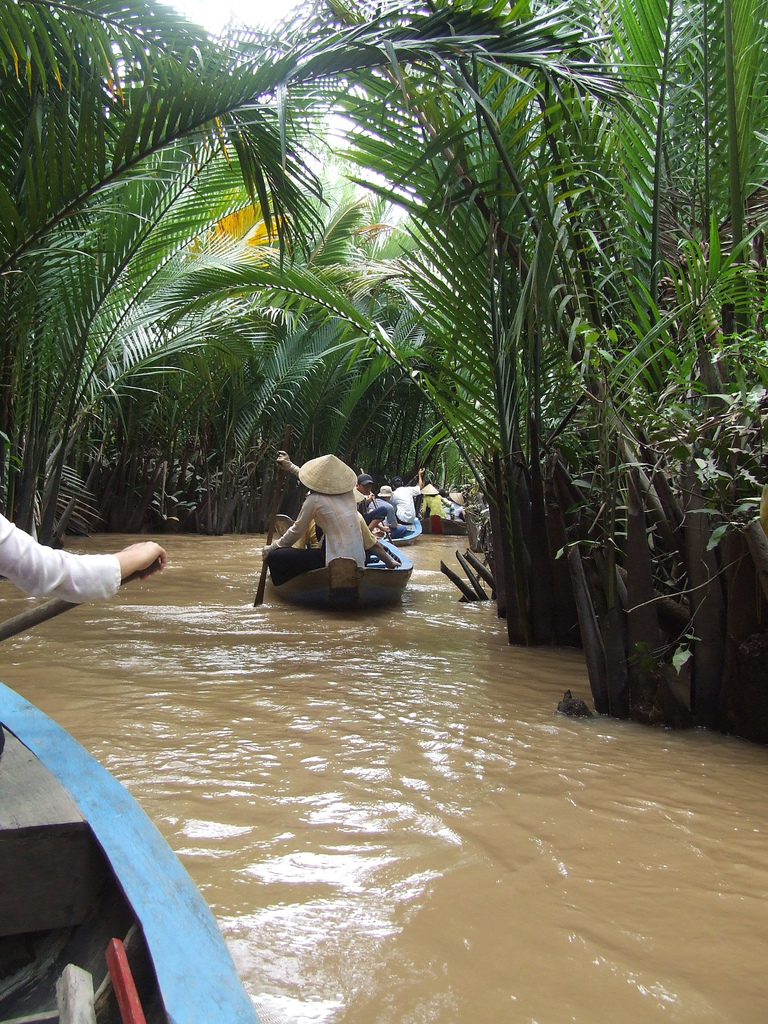
Mekong Delta

The inhabitants of the Mekong Delta region are predominantly ethnic Vietnamese. It is home to the largest Khmer population outside of Cambodia. The Khmer minority population live primarily in the Trà Vinh, Sóc Trăng, and Muslim Chăm in Tân Châu, An Giang and Cà Mau provinces. There are also sizeable Hoa (ethnic Chinese) populations in the Kiên Giang, and Trà Vinh provinces. The region had a population of 17.33 million people in 2011.

The languages spoken in the Mekong Delta are mainly Vietnamese and Khmer which cover almost the majority of the population. Then there are also various Chinese languages spoken by the Hoa community, as well as the Cham and Mekong Delta Malay languages which are the lingua franca for the Muslim community there.

The population of the Mekong Delta has been growing relatively slowly in recent years, mainly due to out-migration. The region's population only increased by 471,600 people between 2005 and 2011, while 166,400 people migrated out in 2011 alone. Together with the central coast regions, it has one of the slowest growing populations in the country. Population growth rates have been between 0.3% and 0.5% between 2008 and 2011, while they have been over 2% in the neighbouring southeastern region. Net migration has been negative in all of these years. The region also has a relatively low fertility rate, at 1.8 children per woman in 2010 and 2011, down from 2.0 in 2005.

== Provinces ==
Province- Level Division	Capital	Area		Population (2024)	Population density	
Province- Level Division	Capital	km²	mi²	Population (2024)	km²	mi²
An Giang	Rạch Giá ward	9,889.91	3,818.52	4,952,238	500	1,300
Cà Mau	Tân Thành ward	7,942.39	3,066.57	2,606,672	328	850
Đồng Tháp	Mỹ Tho ward	5,938.64	2,292.92	4,370,046	736	1,910
Vĩnh Long	Long Châu ward	6,296.20	2,430.98	4,257,581	676	1,750
Cần Thơ	Ninh Kiều ward	6,360.83	2,455.93	4,199,824	660	1,700

== Economy ==
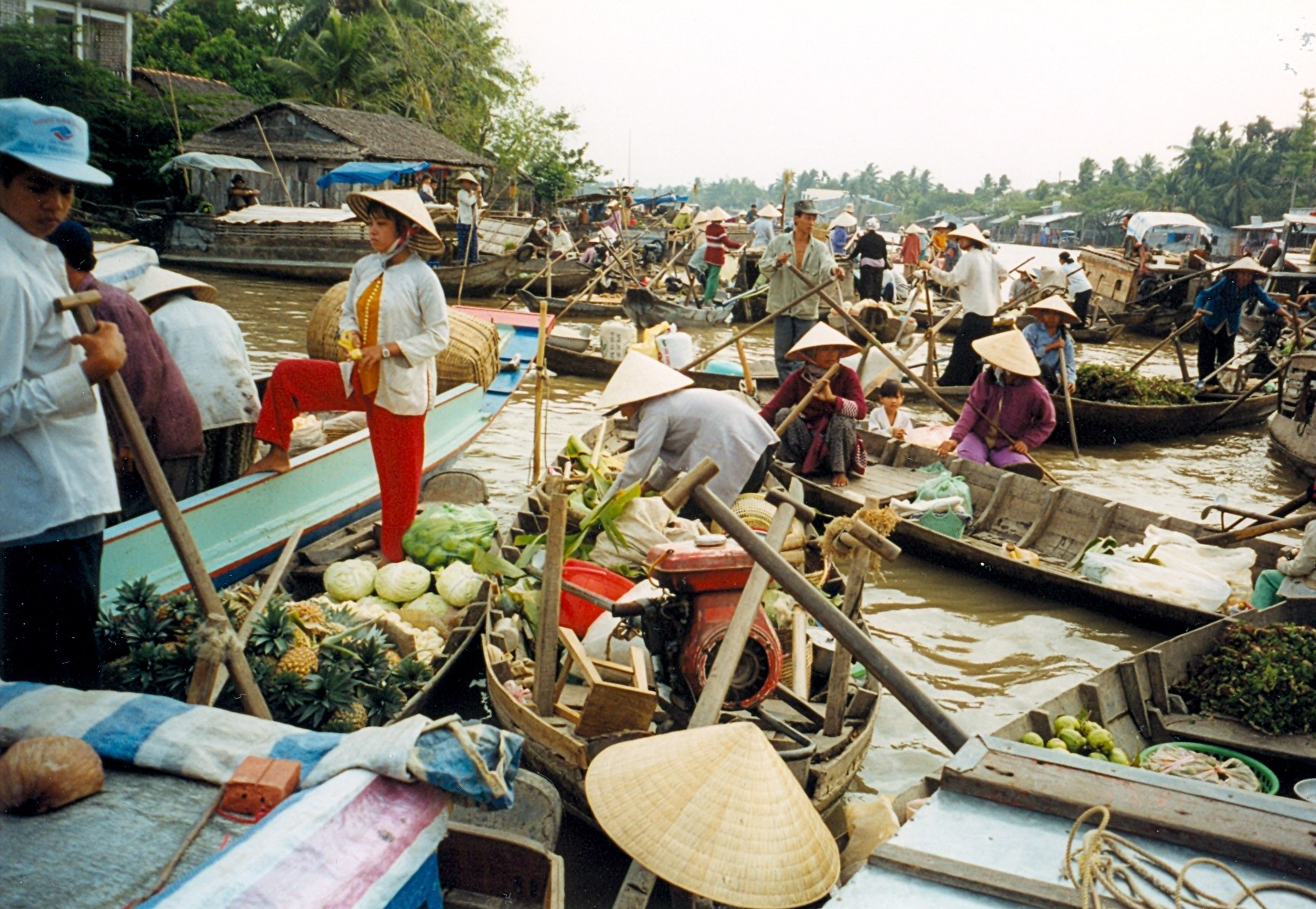
Floating market of Cần Thơ

The Mekong Delta is by far Vietnam's most productive region in agriculture and aquaculture, while its role in industry and foreign direct investment (FDI) is much smaller.

=== Agriculture ===
2.6 million ha in the Mekong Delta are used for agriculture, which is one fourth of Vietnam's total. Due to its mostly flat terrain and few forested areas (except for Cà Mau province), almost two-thirds (64.5%) of the region's land can be used for agriculture. The share of agricultural land exceeds 80% in Cần Thơ and neighbouring Hậu Giang province and is below 50% only in Cà Mau province (32%) and Bạc Liêu province (42%). The region's land used for growing cereals makes up 47% of the national total, more than northern and central Vietnam combined. Most of this is used for rice cultivation.

Rice output in 2011 was 23,186,000t, 54.8% of Vietnam's total output. The most productive areas are Kiên Giang province, An Giang province, and Đồng Tháp province, producing over 3 million tonnes each and almost 11 million tonnes together. Any two of these provinces produce more than the entire Red River Delta. Only three provinces produce less than 1 million tonnes of rice (Bạc Liêu province, Cà Mau province, Bến Tre province).

Oxfam reported in 2026 on the development of a producer cooperative owned by Mekong Delta rice farmers which enabled producers to share the risks associated with poor harvests and avoid loss of income when yields were higher.

=== Fishery ===
The Mekong Delta is also Vietnam's most important fishing region. It has almost half of Vietnam's capacity of offshore fishing vessels (mostly in Kien Gian with almost 1/4, Bến Tre, Cà Mau, Tiền Giang, Bạc Liêu). Fishery output was at 3.168 million tons (58.3% of Vietnam) and has experienced rapid growth from 1.84mt in 2005. All of Vietnam's largest fishery producers with over 300kt of output are in the Mekong Delta: Kiên Giang, Cà Mau, Đồng Tháp, An Giang, and Bến Tre.

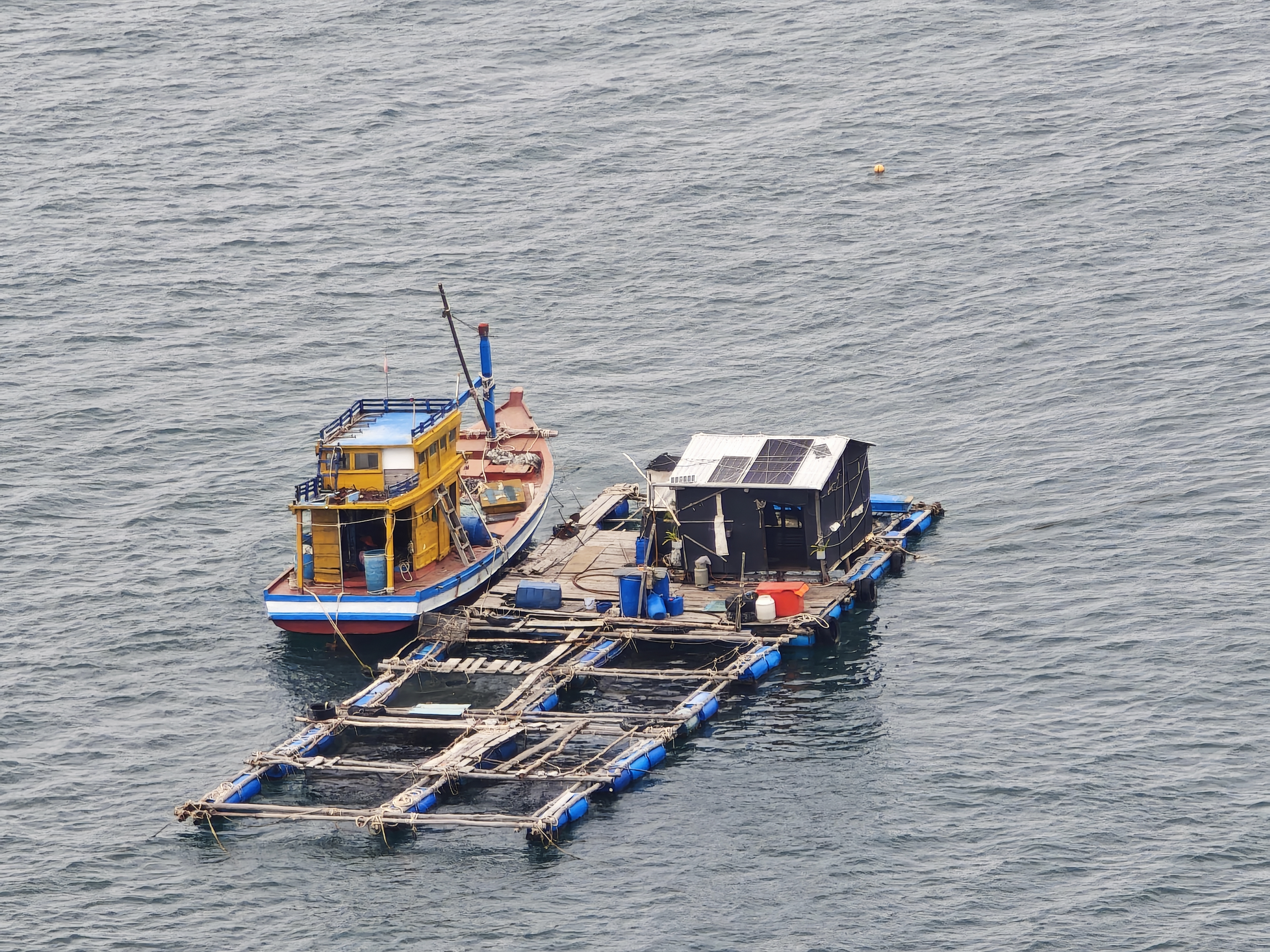
Fish farm in Vietnam

Despite the region's large offshore fishing fleet, 2/3 (2.13 million tonnes out of Vietnam's total of 2.93) of fishery output actually comes from aquaculture.

December 2015, aquaculture production was estimated at 357 thousand tons, up 11% compared to the same period last year, bringing the total aquaculture production 3516 thousand tons in 2015, up 3.0% compared to the same period. Although aquaculture production has increased overall, aquaculture still faces many difficulties coming from export markets.

=== Industry and FDI ===
The Mekong Delta is not strongly industrialized, but is still the third out of seven regions in terms of industrial gross output. The region's industry accounts for 10% of Vietnam's total as of 2011. Almost half of the region's industrial production is concentrated in Cần Thơ, Long An province and Cà Mau province. Cần Thơ is the economic center of the region and more industrialized than the other provinces. Long An has been the only province of the region to attract part of the manufacturing booming around Ho Chi Minh City and is seen by other provinces as an example of successful FDI attraction. Cà Mau province is home to a large industrial zone including power plants and a fertiliser factory. Accumulated foreign direct investment in the Mekong Delta until 2011 was $10.257bn. It has been highly concentrated in a few provinces, led by Long An and Kiên Giang with over $3bn each, Tiền Giang and Cần Thơ (around 850m), Cà Mau (780m) and Hậu Giang (673m), while the other provinces have received less than 200m each. In general, the performance of the region in attracting FDI is evaluated as unsatisfactory by local analysts and policymakers. Companies from Ho Chi Minh City have also invested heavily in the region. Their investment from 2000 to June 2011 accounted for 199 trillion VND (almost $10bn).

== Infrastructure ==
The construction of the Cần Thơ Bridge, a cable-stayed bridge over the largest distributary of the Mekong River, was completed on April 12, 2010, three years after a collapse that killed 54 and injured nearly 100 workers. The bridge replaces the ferry system that currently runs along National Route 1, and links Vĩnh Long province and Cần Thơ city. The cost of construction is estimated to be 4.842 trillion Vietnamese đồng (approximately 342.6 million United States dollars), making it the most expensive bridge in Vietnam.

The region is served by 4 airports:

- Can Tho International Airport
- Ca Mau Airport
- Rach Gia Airport
- Phu Quoc International Airport (serving the island of Phú Quốc)

However, Ho Chi Minh City's Tan Son Nhat International Airport is another alternative airport which provides more domestic and international destinations. The airport is approximately located 160 km north of Cần Thơ.

== Culture ==
Life in the Mekong Delta revolves much around the river, and many of the villages are often accessible by rivers and canals rather than by road.

The region is home to cải lương, a form of Kinh/Vietnamese folk opera. Cai Luong Singing appeared in Mekong Delta in the early 20th century. Cai Luong Singing is often performed to the accompaniment of guitar and zither. Cai Luong is a kind of play telling a story. This often includes two main parts: the dialogue part and the singing part to express their thoughts and emotions.

=== Cuisine ===
The Mekong Delta cuisine relies heavily on fresh products which is abundant in the new land with heavy use of seafoods and unique ingredients of the region such as palm sugar, basa fish and wild herbs and flowers such as điên điển, so đũa, kèo nèo. The history of the region being a newly settled area reflects on its cuisine, with Ẩm thực khẩn hoang or Settlers cuisine means dishes are prepared fresh from wild and newly-caught ingredients. The cuisine is also influenced by Khmer, Cham and Chinese settlers. This differs itself from the cuisine of other regions of Vietnam.

=== Literature and movies ===
Nguyễn Ngọc Tư, an author from Cà Mau province, has written many popular books about life in the Mekong Delta such as:

- Ngọn đèn không tắt (The Inextinguishable Light, 2000)
- Ông ngoại (Grandpa, 2001)
- Biển người mênh mông (The Ocean of People, 2003)
- Giao thừa (New Year's Eve, 2003)
- Nước chảy mây trôi (Flowing Waters, Flying Clouds, 2004)
- Cánh đồng bất tận (The Endless Field, 2005)

The 2004 film The Buffalo Boy is set in Cà Mau province.

Some Vietnamese films on the topic of life in the Mekong Delta attract the attention of a large audience: Tình Mẫu Tử (Mother and child love, 2019), Phận làm dâu (Bride's fate, 2018), etc.

== See also ==
- GMS Environment Operations Center
- Greater Mekong Sub-region Academic and Research Network
- Mekong Basin Disease Surveillance
