= Outey II =

King of Cambodia (1758–1775)

King of Cambodia
- Reign: 1758–1775
- Predecessor: Ang Tong
- Successor: Ang Non II
- Born: Ang Ton; 1740
- Died: 1777
- House: Varman dynasty
- Father: Prince Outeyreachea
- Mother: Ang Peou Mohaksatrei
- Religion: Buddhism

Outey II (Note: In Vietnamese record, he was called Nặc Ông Tôn (匿螉尊).) (Khmer: ឧទ័យទី២; 1740–1777) was king of Cambodia from 1758 to 1775. He reigned under the name of Outeyreachea II, Reameathipadei IV or Neareayreachea II.

Outey was the oldest son of Prince Outeyreachea (1707–1753) and Princess Peou, a daughter of King Ang Em, which made him heir to both rival branches of the Varman dynasty, since Outey's grandfather was King Ang Tong, who had ruled Cambodia.

When Outey was born in 1740, one year after the Vietnamese were expelled by the Siamese army, Chey Chettha's son King Thommo Reachea was ruling Cambodia for the third time in his life, until he died in 1747. Thommo Reachea son and heir was murdered by a brother, the ministers chose a third brother as King, Ang Tong in 1748, but after being attacked by his relative Satha and a Vietnamese army, he fled to Siam. During his exile, the people in Cambodia drove out the Vietnamese once again, and chose Chey Chettha V as King, who after ruling Cambodia for six years, died in 1755, when Outey's grandfather Ang Tong once again was elected King.

Ang Tong died in Pursat in 1757 and Outey became King in 1758, after his grandfather Ang Tong's death.

Outey chose to rule under the protection of the Vietnamese, refused to help the Siamese king Taksin and provoked the Siamese king by calling him "half-Chinese", resulting in Siam sending an army in 1769, during which second invasion he fled to Vietnam in 1771, but returned later, and was reestablished as puppet king in Oudong by a Vietnamese army. A year later he had to flee to Vietnam again.

He returned once again in 1772, and reigned again, under the supervision of a Vietnamese official. Because King Outey II reduced his support of Siamese king Taksin, and after provocations Taksin invaded Cambodia, burned down Phnom Penh, and after Outey abdicated, his cousin Ang Non II was elected king in 1775.

Outey received the title Maha Upayuvaraja (ឧភយោរាជ) after his abdication. The title means "Great Joint King", and was usually borne by kings who had abdicated but retained executive powers. In return, Outey's elder brother Ang Tham was crowned as Maha Uparaja the title of heir apparent. In Vietnamese records, Ang Non, Outey and Ang Tham were called the First King, the Second King and the Third King, respectively. However, this arrangement proved to be unsatisfactory. Both Outey and Ang Tham were assassinated in 1777, probably by Ang Non II.

== Siamese invasion of Cambodia (1769-1771) ==
After Siamese King Taksin defeats burmese army in 1767, During Cambodian King Outey II Reign, there were two wars with Siam, The first war was in 1769, when Siam launched a land attack on Banteay Pech but failed to succeed due to news of King Taksin's death, forcing them to withdraw. The second war occurred in 1771. Thai sources state that Siam captured Banteay Pech, and Cambodian King Outey II fled to Vietnam, subsequently crowning King Ang Non II of Cambodia as the new King. However, Cambodian sources say that Siam failed to capture Banteay Pech and allowed King Ang Non II to reside in Kampot Province. In 1775, when Annam's support for Cambodian King Outey II weakened, Cambodian King Outey II abdicated to King Ang Non II, who served as Crown Prince until his death in 1777.
