= Sijhata =

Sijhata (18th-century) was a Cambodian princess and queen consort, married to King Sattha.

Sijhata was the daughter of King Jai Jettha IV. King Jai Jettha IV and his son-in-law, Sijhata's brother-in-law Ang Im, ruled as co-regents between 1710 and 1722, when Jai Jettha IV's son Dhammaraja was at the Thai court.

King Jai Jettha IV died in 1729, and his co-regent Ang Im abdicated in favor of his son Sattha, who was married to his wife’s half-sister Sijhata, who thereby became queen. It appears that Queen Sijhata lived separated from King Sattha. An inscription describes how an anuj khshatri, ‘young queen’ established her own court at Samron Sen, attended the children and nephews and nieces of the king. This woman is identified with Sijhata.

Sattha ruled from Longvaek until some time after his father’s death in 1736. When Sijhata's father-in-law, the abdicated ex-King Ang Im died in 1736, Queen Sijhata and her relatives sought to oust him.

The same inscription also speaks of a maha-kshatri, ‘great queen’, ‘the daughter of the King Kaev Hva’. Sijhata has been confused with her, but they were two different people. In 1747, An oknha was instructed to march against the maha-kshatri in a successful campaign which ended in him ‘routing her completely. … He captured the lady and a mass of goods, and escorted her to the king in order to prostrate herself and offer her slaves and her belongings.’ The identity of this maha-kshatri is unknown. It has been suggested that she was the daughter of a rajaputri touch (‘lesser prince’) mentioned at Longvaek in 1737 as a supporter of Dhammaraja, and who in turn has been pointed out as Cun, nephew of Dhammaraja, whose title and widow were distributed to two of Dhammaraja’s own sons upon his death in 1743. Another theory is that she was a daughter of King Ang Im, granddaughter of King Jai Jettha IV and half sister of King Dhammaraja. The episode is not mentioned in the Cambodian royal chronicles, which would not have been expected had she been a legitimate and defeated competitor of King Dhammaraja.
