= Ang Chee =

Ang Chee (អង្គជី) is the name of the following kings of Cambodia:

- Kaev Hua II (1452–1677, reigned 1673–1674)
- Satha II (1702–1749, reigned 1722–1736 and 1749)
