= Minnyi Mintha =

Minnyi Mintha (Burmese: မင်းညီမင်းသား, pronounced [mɪ́ɰ̃ɲ̥ì mɪ́ɰ̃ðá]) was the common title for all Princes of the Blood of the Burmese monarchy (i.e. sons, grandsons, brothers and nephews of a sovereign), who were all assigned fiefdoms when they came of age, and promoted to this rank.

== Specific ranks and titles for dynasty members ==
It was divided into four principal grades, as follows, awarded individually:

- The Great Deputy King: Maha Uparaja Anaudrapa Einshay Min (မဟာဥပရာဇာအနောက်ရပအိမ်ရှေ့မင်း), incorrectly termed Crown Prince by Europeans, and addressed as His Royal Highness.
- Viceroy or governor of a province: (territorial title) Bayin Khan (ဘုရင်ခံ), i.e. Viceroy, with the style of His Royal Highness.
- Great Princes, a maximum of eighteen at any one time, divided into nine great princes of the left and nine great princes of the right: Minthaya-gyi (မင်းသာရကြီး)), together with the rank of Thado Min (သတိုးမင်း), i.e. Prince, with the style of His Royal Highness.
- Middle Princes, a maximum of eighteen at any one time, divided into nine middle princes of the left and nine middle princes of the right: Mintha-lat (မင်းသားလတ်)), together with the rank of Min Ye (မင်းရဲ, Prince, with the style of His Royal Highness.

Specific titles were also used not by office, but by birth; however these were NOT indicative of the succession, for which there were no effective rules, a power struggle in the palace was the rule.

- The eldest son of the sovereign, by his chief Queen: Shwe Kodaw-gyi Awratha (ရွှေကိုယ်တော်ကြီးဩရသ), i.e. Prince with the style of His Royal Highness.
- younger sons of the sovereign, by his chief Queen: Shwe Kodaw-gyi Rajaputra (ရွှေကိုယ်တော်ကြီးရာဇာပုတြာ), i.e. Prince with the style of His Royal Highness.
- sons of the sovereign, by his senior Queens: Shwe Kodaw-gyi (ရွှေကိုယ်တော်ကြီး), i.e. Prince with the style of His Royal Highness.
- sons of the sovereign, by his junior wives: Kodaw-gyi (ကိုယ်တော်ကြီး), i.e. Prince with the style of His Royal Highness.
- sons of a Prince, by a junior wife: Hteik Tin (ထိပ်တင်), i.e. Prince.

== See also ==
- Burmese royal titles
