= Ang Non II =

King of Cambodia (1775-1779)

Ang Non II Reameathipadei III

King of Cambodia
- Reign: 1775–1779
- Predecessor: Outey II
- Successor: Ang Eng
- Born: 1739; Oudong, Cambodia
- Died: August 1779 (aged 40); Phnom Kamrieng
- Dynasty: Varman
- Father: Chey Chettha V
- Religion: Buddhism

Ang Non II (Note: In Vietnamese records, he was called Nặc Ông Nộn (匿螉嫩). Or Nặc Ông Vinh in Trần Trọng Kim's Việt Nam sử lược.) (1739 – August 1779) was King of Cambodia from 1775 to his death in 1779. He reigned under the name of Reameathiptei III.

Ang Non grew up in a Cambodian kingdom that was often under the control of either the Vietnamese or the Siamese. During his childhood, Cambodia was ruled by Thommo Reachea III (1736–1747) who held his position with the support of the Siamese. In 1749, during civil unrest, Satha II attempted to take the throne with the help of the Vietnamese. Shortly thereafter, Satha fled to Vietnam where he died in Saigon.

For 24 of the next 26 years, Cambodia was ruled by two monarchs, Chey Chettha V (1749–1755) and Outey II (1758–1775) who allied with the Vietnamese. During his rule, Outey II diminished his support for King Taksin of Siam. After provocations, Taksin and the Siamese invaded Cambodia and burned down Phnom Penh. In 1775, Outey abdicated and Ang Non was elected king under the name Reamea Thipadei III.

During his reign, Ang Non served as a puppet for the Siamese and led Cambodia in fighting against the Vietnamese during the tumultuous years in Vietnam after the Tay Son Rebellion.

Ang Non remained on the Cambodian throne until 1779, when he was captured and drowned by Vietnamese agents at the pond of Khayong, near Phanom Kamraeng. His four sons were all murdered at the citadel of Banthaiphet in August 1779 by Phraya Wibunrat (later Samdach Chau Phraya Kalahom).
