= Outey I =

King of Cambodia from 1695 to 1696

- King of Cambodia

King of Cambodia
- Reign: 1695–1696
- Predecessor: Chey Chettha IV
- Successor: Chey Chettha IV
- Born: 1672
- Died: 1696 (aged 23–24)
- Spouse: Princess Sujatavati
- Issue: Ang Tong
Names
- Brhat Pada Samdach Sdach Brhat Rajankariya Brhat Narayana Ramadipati Brhat Udayaraja Parama Bupati
- Father: Kaev Hua II

Outey I (1672–1696), also known as Udayaraja II or Narai Ramathipadi II, born Ang Yong (Khmer: អង្គយ៉ង), was the Cambodian king reigned from 1695 to 1696.

Outey I was a son of Kaev Hua II. He succeeded the king after his uncle Chey Chettha IV's first abdication. He reigned only ten months, died suddenly. Chey Chettha IV then regained power.

Outey I Varman Dynasty Born: 1672 Died: 1696
Regnal titles
Preceded by Chey Chettha IV	King of Cambodia; 1695–1696	Succeeded by Chey Chettha IV
