= Chey Chettha IV =

King of Cambodia

King of Cambodia
- First reign: 1675–1695
- Predecessor: Ang Nan
- Successor: Outey I
- Vice king: Ang Nan (1682-1689); Ang Em (1689-1700)
- Second reign: 1696–1700
- Predecessor: Outey I
- Successor: Ang Em
- Vice king: Ang Em (1689-1700)
- Third reign: 1701–1702
- Predecessor: Ang Em
- Successor: Thommo Reachea III
- Vice king: Ang Em (1701-1710)
- Fourth reign: 1705–1706
- Predecessor: Thommo Reachea III
- Successor: Thommo Reachea III
- Vice king: Ang Em (1701-1710)
- Born: Ang Sor; 1656
- Died: 1725 (aged 68–69)
- Issue: Sijhata, Thommo Reachea III
Names
- Preah Bat Samdech Chey Chettha IV
- House: Varman Dynasty
- Father: Barom Reachea V
- Mother: Queen Tey
- Religion: Buddhism

Chey Chettha IV (1656–1725), born Ang Sor, was a Cambodian king for several periods in Cambodia's history (r. 1675–1695, 1696–1700, 1701–1702, 1705–1706).

== Life ==
He was the second son of Barom Reachea V and also a younger brother of Kaev Hua II. Vietnamese army attacked Phnom Penh, the king Kaev Hua II fled into forest. Ang Sor surrendered to Vietnamese. He was crowned the Cambodian king by Vietnamese, while Ang Nan (Padumaraja IV) was crowned the vice king (uparaja). Chey Chettha IV occupied Longvek, Padumaraja IV occupied Prey Nokor (Saigon). Both of them paid tribute to Vietnamese Nguyễn lord.

In 1687, he temporarily abdicated in favour of his mother Queen Tey, who reigned for few months before returning the throne to him.

In 1688, Dương Ngạn Địch, a Chinese adventurer and also a general of Nguyễn lord, was murdered by Hoàng Tiến (黃進). Hoàng Tiến occupied Mỹ Tho and revolted against Nguyễn lord. Hoàng Tiến also attacked Cambodia. Using this excuse, Chey Chettha IV started to building fortifications and did not pay tribute to Nguyễn lord. In the same year the rebellion was put down, Chey Chettha had to pay tribute like before.

Chey Chettha IV abdicated in favour of his nephew Outey I in 1695. In the next year Outey I died, Chey Chettha IV restored.

Nguyễn Hữu Cảnh was sent to Saigon by Nguyễn lord to expand his southern territory. It violated Cambodia's advantages; Chey Chettha IV tried to drive them out, however, he was defeated. In 1700, Vietnamese army captured Phnom Penh. The vice king (uparaja) Ang Em (Barom Ramadhipati) surrendered to Vietnamese, and ascended the throne. Chey Chettha IV surrendered in the next year, he was allowed to restore.

Chey Chettha IV abdicated in favour of his son Thommo Reachea III in 1702. Chey Chettha IV then married a daughter to the vice king Ang Em. But, Thommo Reachea III drove out Ang Em with the help of Ayutthaya Kingdom. Ang Em fled to Saigon, in there he was supported by Nguyễn lord. A Vietnamese army under Nguyễn Cửu Vân (阮久雲) invaded Cambodia again. Thommo Reachea III fled to Ayutthaya Kingdom. Ang Em came back to Cambodia and lived in Longvek. Chey Chettha IV was installed as the king by Vietnamese. He abdicated in 1706, and Thommo Reachea III crowned the king again.

With the help of Ayutthaya Kingdom, Thommo Reachea III came back to Cambodia, and captured Longvek in 1714. A Vietnamese army under Trần Thượng Xuyên and Nguyễn Cửu Phú (阮久富) was sent to Cambodia to help Ang Em. They besieged Longvek. Chey Chettha IV and Thommo Reachea III were forced to flee to Ayutthaya Kingdom.

Chey Chettha IV Varman Dynasty Born: 1656 Died: 1725
Regnal titles
Preceded by Ang Nan	King of Cambodia; 1675–1695	Succeeded by Outey I
Preceded by Outey I	King of Cambodia; 1676–1700	Succeeded by Ang Em
Preceded by Ang Em	King of Cambodia; 1701–1702	Succeeded by Thommo Reachea III
Preceded by Thommo Reachea III	King of Cambodia; 1705–1706	Succeeded by Thommo Reachea III
