= Thommo Reachea IV =

King of Cambodia

Thommo Reachea IV ព្រះបាទសម្តេចធម្មោរាជា ទី៤

King of Cambodia
- Reign: 1747
- Predecessor: Thommo Reachea III
- Successor: Ang Tong
- Born: Ang Em; 1706
- Died: 1747 (aged 40–41)
Names
- Preah Bat Samdech Thommoreachea IV
- House: Varman Dynasty
- Father: Thommo Reachea III
- Religion: Buddhism

Thommo Reachea IV (Khmer: ព្រះបាទសម្តេចធម្មោរាជា ទី៤) (1706–1747), born Ang Em, was a Cambodian king during Post-Angkor Period (r. 1747).

Thommo Reachea IV was a son of Thommo Reachea III. He ascended the throne after his father's death in 1747. He struggled for power with his brother Ang Hing and brother-in-law Ang Tong. In the same year he was murdered by Ang Hing; then Ang Hing was murdered by Ang Tong.

Thommo Reachea IV Varman Dynasty Born: 1706 Died: 1747
Regnal titles
Preceded by Thommo Reachea III	King of Cambodia; 1747	Succeeded by Ang Tong
