= Ang Nan =

King of Cambodia (1674)

Batom Reachea III បទុមរាជាទី៣
- King of Cambodia

King of Cambodia
- Reign: 1674
- Predecessor: Preah Keo II
- Successor: Chey Chettha IV

Vice King of Cambodia
- Reign: 1682–1689
- Predecessor: Outey
- Successor: Ang Em
- King: Chey Chettha IV
- Born: Ang Nan; 1654
- Died: 1691 (aged 36–37); Srey Santhor, Cambodia
- Spouse: Sri Thida
Names
- Preah Bat Samdech Batom Reachea III
- House: Varman Dynasty
- Father: Ang Im
- Religion: Buddhism

Batom Reachea III (Khmer: បទុមរាជាទី៣, born Ang Nan; 1654–1691) was a Cambodian vice king (uparaja) from 1682 to 1689.

Ang Nan was the grandson of vice king Outey. In 1674, with the help of the Ayutthaya Kingdom, Preah Keo II drove him out. Ang Nan fled to Thái Khang (present day Khánh Hòa Province of Vietnam), and sought help from Vietnamese Nguyễn lord. The Vietnamese army under Nguyễn Dương Lâm (阮楊林) and Nguyễn Đình Phái (阮廷派) invaded Cambodia, captured Prey Nokor (Saigon), then attacked Phnom Penh. Preah Keo II retreated into the forest and Ang Nan was crowned the vice king (uparaja) by the Vietnamese. Ang Nan occupied Prey Nokor, while king Chey Chettha IV occupied Longvek. Both of them paid tribute to Nguyễn lord every year.

However, Ang Nan wanted to overthrow Chey Chettha IV. In 1682, he recruited refugees from Ming China who had settled in Cambodia with Vietnamese immigrants, resumed fighting against Chey Chettha IV. In response, Kau Kan (Bassac, present day Sóc Trăng) and Preah Trapeang (Trà Vinh) were ceded to these Chinese adventures. In 1689, with the help of the Nguyễn lord, he made his last attempt to overthrow Chey Chettha IV. He died in Srey Santhor.

Ang Nan Varman Dynasty Born: 1654 Died: 1691
Regnal titles
Preceded by Kaev Hua II	King of Cambodia; 1674	Succeeded by Chey Chettha IV
