= Ang Tong =

King of Cambodia (1747–1749, 1756–1757)

King of Cambodia
- Reign: 1748–1749
- Predecessor: Thommo Reachea IV
- Successor: Satha II
- Reign: 1756–1757
- Predecessor: Chey Chettha V
- Successor: Outey II
- Born: Ang Tong; 1692
- Died: 1757 (aged 64–65)
- Issue: Prince Outeyreachea
- Reameathiptei III
- House: Varman Dynasty
- Father: Outey I
- Religion: Buddhism

Reameathiptei III (Khmer: ព្រះបាទរាមាធិបតីទី៣) (1692–1757), born Ang Tong (Khmer: អង្គទង pronounced [ʔɑŋ.tɔːŋ]), was a Cambodian king (r. 1747–1749, 1756–1757).

Ang Tong was a son-in-law of Thommo Reachea III. He struggled for power with Thommo Reachea IV and Ang Hing. Later he killed Ang Hing and ascended the throne. In 1749, the Vietnamese army invaded Cambodia and installed Satha II. Ang Tong fled to the Ayutthaya Kingdom.

Ang Tong was restored as king after Chey Chettha V's death. He died in Pursat in 1757. This time he was succeeded by his grandson Outey II.

== Sources ==
- Achille Dauphin-Meunier, Histoire du Cambodge, Que sais-je ? N° 916, P.U.F 1968.
- Anthony Stokvis, Manuel d'histoire, de généalogie et de chronologie de tous les États du globe, depuis les temps les plus reculés jusqu'à nos jours, préf. H. F. Wijnman, éditions Brill, Leyde 1888, réédition 1966, Volume 1 Part1: Asie, chapitre XIV §.9 « Kambodge » Listes et tableau généalogique n°34 p. 337–338.
- Peter Truhart, Regents of Nations, K.G Saur Münich, 1984–1988 ISBN 359810491X, Art. « Kampuchea », p. 1732.

Ang Tong Varman Dynasty Born: 1692 Died: 1757
Regnal titles
Preceded by Thommo Reachea IV	King of Cambodia; 1748–1749	Succeeded by Satha II
Preceded by Chey Chettha V	King of Cambodia; 1756–1757	Succeeded by Outey II
