= Kaev Hua II =

King of Cambodia

Preah Keo II

King of Cambodia
- Reign: 1673–1674
- Predecessor: Chey Chettha III
- Successor: Batom Reachea III
- Born: Ang Chee; 1652
- Died: 1677 (aged 24–25)
- Issue: Outey I
Names
- Preah Bat Samdech Kaev Hua II
- House: Varman Dynasty
- Father: Barom Reachea V
- Religion: Buddhism

Preah Keo II (Khmer: ព្រះកែវហ៊្វាទី២, born Ang Chee (Khmer: អង្គជី); 1652–1677) also known as Kaev Hua II or Keo Fa II was a Cambodian king from 1673 to 1674. He was the son of Barom Reachea V.

During his reign Preah Keo II came into conflict with Prince Ang Nan. With the help of the Ayutthaya Kingdom, he drove out Ang Nan to Vietnam. Ang Nan sought help from the Vietnamese Nguyễn lord and the Vietnamese army under Nguyễn Dương Lâm and Nguyễn Đình Phái invaded Cambodia, captured Prey Nokor (Saigon), then attacked Phnom Penh. Preah Keo II was defeated, and retreated into forest. There, he continued fighting against the Vietnamese until he was killed in 1677.

Kaev Hua II Varman Dynasty Born: 1652 Died: 1677
Regnal titles
Preceded by Chey Chettha III	King of Cambodia; 1673–1674	Succeeded by Batom Reachea III
