= Ang Em =

King of Cambodia

King of Cambodia
- Reign: 1700–1701
- Predecessor: Chey Chettha IV
- Successor: Chey Chettha IV
- Reign: 1710–1722 and 1729-1730
- Predecessor: Thommo Reachea III
- Successor: Satha II
- Born: Ang Em; 1674
- Died: 1731 (aged 56–57)
- Issue: Satha II, Princess Peou
Names
- Preah Bat Samdech Barom Ramadhipati; Kaev Hua III; Chey Chettha V
- House: Varman Dynasty
- Father: Ang Nan
- Religion: Buddhism

Kaev Hua III or Chey Chettha V (Khmer: បរម រាមាធិបតី) (1674–1731), born Ang Em, was a Cambodian king in the early 18th century (r. 1700–1701, 1710–1722, 1729–1730).

Ang Em was a son of vice king Ang Nan. In 1700, a Vietnamese army under Nguyễn Hữu Cảnh invaded Cambodia, he was installed as the king by Vietnamese. In the next year, Chey Chettha IV surrendered, and was allowed to restore. Ang Em was deposed.

Chey Chettha IV abdicated in favour of Thommo Reachea III in 1702. Chey Chettha IV married a daughter to Ang Em; this was a political marriage. However, Thommo Reachea III drove out Ang Em with the help of Ayutthaya Kingdom. Ang Em fled to Saigon in 1705, and sought help from Vietnamese Nguyễn lord. He came back to Longvek with Vietnamese army. In 1710, Ang Em ascended the throne.

In 1714, Thommo Reachea III captured Longvek with the help of Ayutthaya Kingdom. Ang Em was in dangerous. A Vietnamese army under Trần Thượng Xuyên and Nguyễn Cửu Phú (阮久富) was sent to Cambodia to help Ang Em. Thommo Reachea III and Chey Chettha IV were defeated and fled to Ayutthaya Kingdom.

In 1722, Ang Em abdicated in favour of his son Satha II. In 1729, he resumed the government and was crowned as supreme king xith the title of Chey Chettha V. He reigned for six months and then abdicated a second time in favour of his eldest son, Satha II (1730).

== Rule without authority ==
Rule without authority

King Ang Em, although his uncle, King Chey Chettha IV, had given him the throne, did not have the authority to command his officials. Therefore, King Ang Em only reigned for one year, but he transferred the throne to King Chey Chettha IV in 1700 AD.

== Cambodian-Siamese War (1715) ==
Cambodian-Siamese War (1715)

In 1714, the Siamese king Borommakot sent two envoys, Chao Panyapol Tep and Chao Panyathiracha, to demand tribute from the king of Cambodia, King Ang Em III, Angkor. The king of Cambodia refused to submit to the Siamese. A year later, in 1715, the Siamese king sent 100,500 troops to invade Cambodia, directly at Battambang Province . Since King Ang Em had not yet gathered enough troops to resist the Siamese, he asked for military assistance from the Annamites. Annam sent 25,000 troops, plus 70,000 of King Ang Em's own troops, for a total of 95,000 troops. 1,500 Cambodian homes were burned by the Siamese army. However, the Siamese army was unable to capture Battambang province, as the two armies were of similar size.

== Cambodian-Siamese War (1717) ==
Cambodian-Siamese War (1717)

In 1717, the Siamese king sent his army to invade Cambodia for the second time. Siam raised 160,000 troops divided into four divisions. The first division was led by Srey Dhammareach , a former Cambodian king who had attempted to usurp the throne from Ang Em. Srey Dhammareach led the first division to attack Battambang Province , the second division was led by Prince Tong II , the son of Panya Yang, to attack Pursat Province , the third division was a naval force led by Panya Kasa, to attack Banteay Meas Province , Kampot Province , the fourth division was a naval force led by Panya Techo, to attack the port of Peam Province, Kampuchea Krom. The Siamese army in each division was 40,000. King Ang Em asked for military assistance from Annam for the second time, Annam agreed by sending 50,000 troops to help fight Cambodia without any hesitation. In the mind of the King of Annam, he did not want to see Siam swallow Cambodia, because if Siam swallowed Cambodia at this time, it would mean that before and after Siam and Annam would fight each other on a large scale to continue to swallow each other's territory. Therefore, the King of Annam at that time wanted to use Cambodia as a fence to protect Siamese influence. King Ang Em had gathered an army of 90,000 plus the auxiliary army of Annam, which was another 50,000 people, so the total army of Cambodia that was ready to fight the Siamese army was 140,000. King Ang Em, Ang Em ordered the auxiliary army of 50,000 of Annam to fight the Siamese army led by King Tong II in Prey Rusanh, Pursat Province. Meanwhile, the Siamese navy, led by Panya Kasa, entered Banteay Meas Province, Kampot Province, to fight another 50,000 Cambodian troops. Another Siamese army, led by Preah Srei Dhammarat, fought against 40,000 Cambodian troops with 250 Cambodian elephants in Battambang province. Another Siamese navy, led by Panya Techo, attacked the port of Peam province , occupied by the Chinese king Mac Cuu. The two armies fought fiercely in the territory of Kampuchea Krom.Because the Siamese had many artillery pieces, they fired on the houses of the Khmer and Annamite people, and 5,000 houses were burned by the Siamese army. While the Siamese army was shooting artillery and burning the houses of the people in a brutal manner, a merchant ship arrived by chance. This was a Portuguese merchant ship led by Captain Alexander Hamilton. It passed through the area and came to negotiate with the Siamese side to stop the attack. The Portuguese ship was 20 times larger than the Siamese warship. The Siamese side was afraid of clashing with the Portuguese. The Siamese stopped the war and negotiated with King Tranh Makkov. The Siamese army led by Prince Ang Thong, who fought against the Annamite army in Pursat province, was defeated by the Annamite army and Prince Ang Thong was also wounded. The fighting between the Siamese army and the Annamite auxiliary army in Pursat province burned down approximately 10,000 Cambodian houses. The four Siamese armies that invaded Cambodia were all defeated, approximately 90,000 Siamese soldiers were killed in Cambodia, and the remaining Siamese troops were withdrawn back to Ayutthaya.

== Pressure from the Siam Kingdom ==
Pressure from the Siam kingdom

After Siam learned that King Ang Em had ascended the throne again, the Crown Prince of Siam sent envoys to demand tribute from the King of Cambodia. In his heart, King Om really wanted to refuse, but knowing that Annam and Siam were at war, Annam had signed a treaty with Siam, and Annam would not send troops to help Cambodia anymore, King Ang Em agreed to send tribute to Siam. The Crown Prince of Siam prepared to send his troops to occupy Nakhon Ratchasima province . King Ang Em, who was heartbroken that Cambodia had lost Nakhon Ratchasima province, fell seriously ill and died in 1729 of the year of the King's reign. King Satha II succeeded his father in his second reign. King Satha II, angry that the Annam had abandoned Cambodia, declared war on the Annam state until the end of the reign.

Ang Em Varman Dynasty Born: 1674 Died: 1731
Regnal titles
Preceded by Chey Chettha IV	King of Cambodia; 1700–1701	Succeeded by Chey Chettha IV
Preceded by Thommo Reachea III	King of Cambodia; 1710–1722	Succeeded by Satha II
