= Chey Chettha V =

King of Cambodia

Chey Chettha V ជ័យជេដ្ឋា ទី៥

King of Cambodia
- Reign: 1749–1755
- Predecessor: Satha II
- Successor: Ang Tong
- Born: Ang Snguon; 1709
- Died: 1755 (aged 45–46)
- Issue: Ang Non II
Names
- Chey Chettha V or Chey Chettha VII
- House: Varman Dynasty
- Father: Thommo Reachea III
- Religion: Buddhism

Chey Chettha V or Chey Chettha VII (1709–1755), born Ang Snguon, was a Cambodian king in Cambodia's history (r. 1749–1755).

Ang Snguon was the second son of Thommo Reachea III. In 1749, Satha II was installed as the Cambodian king by the Vietnamese Nguyễn lords. Which led Cambodia to become a vassal state of the latter. Ang Snguon drove the Vietnamese army out, and proclaimed himself the new king.

During his reign, he tried to conquer the Cham people in eastern Cambodia. He also allied with the Vietnamese Trịnh lords. In 1753, Nguyễn Phúc Khoát ordered the Nguyễn army to attack Cambodia. Ang Snguon fled to Hà Tiên. With the help of mediation by Mạc Thiên Tứ, Ang Snguon was allowed to come back to Cambodia. As a condition, Tầm Bôn (尋奔, present day Tân An of Long An Province) and Lôi Lạt (雷巤, present day Gò Công of Tiền Giang Province) were ceded to the Nguyễn lords.

Chey Chettha V Varman Dynasty Born: 1709 Died: 1755
Regnal titles
Preceded by Satha II	King of Cambodia; 1749–1755	Succeeded by Ang Tong
