= Thommo Reachea III =

King of Cambodia

King of Cambodia
- Reign: 1702–1705
- Predecessor: Chey Chettha IV
- Successor: Chey Chettha IV
- Vice king: Ang Em

King of Cambodia
- Reign: 1707–1714
- Predecessor: Chey Chettha IV
- Successor: Ang Em
- Vice king: Ang Em

King of Cambodia
- Reign: 1736–1747
- Predecessor: Satha II
- Successor: Thommo Reachea IV
- Born: Ang Tham; 1690
- Died: 1747 (aged 56–57)
- Issue: Thommo Reachea IV Chey Chettha V
Names
- Preah Bat Samdech Thommoreachea III
- House: Varman Dynasty
- Father: Chey Chettha IV
- Religion: Buddhism

Thommo Reachea III or Sri Dharmaraja III, Chey Chettha VI (1690–1747), born Ang Tham, (Note: In Vietnamese records, he was called Nặc Ông Thâm (匿螉深).) was a Cambodian king in Cambodia's history (r. 1702–1705, 1707–1714, 1736–1747).

Ang Tham was a son of Chey Chettha IV. He ascended the throne in 1702. He came into conflict with the vice king (uparaja) Ang Em (Barom Ramadhipati), later, he drove out Ang Em with the help of Ayutthaya Kingdom. Ang Em fled to Saigon in 1705, and sought help from Vietnamese Nguyễn lord. Vietnamese army invaded Cambodia, Thommo Reachea III fled to Ayutthaya Kingdom.

With the help of Ayutthaya Kingdom, he captured Longvek. The army of Ang Em was surrounded. A Vietnamese army under Trần Thượng Xuyên and Nguyễn Cửu Phú (阮久富) was sent to Cambodia to help Ang Em. Thommo Reachea III and Chey Chettha IV were defeated and fled to Ayutthaya Kingdom.

In 1736, Thommo Reachea III came back to Cambodia, and drove out the king Satha II.
