= Satha II =

King of Cambodia

King of Cambodia
- Reign: 1722–1736
- Predecessor: Ang Em
- Successor: Thommo Reachea III

King of Cambodia
- Reign: 1749
- Predecessor: Ang Tong
- Successor: Chey Chettha V
- Born: Ang Chee; 1702
- Died: 1749 (aged 46–47)
- Spouse: Sijhata
Names
- Preah Bat Samdech Satha II
- House: Varman Dynasty
- Father: Ang Em
- Religion: Buddhism

Satha II (Khmer: ព្រះបាទ សម្តេច សេដ្ឋា ទី២) or Barom Reachea X (1702–1749), born Ang Chee, was a Cambodian king in the 18th century (r. 1722–1736, 1749).

Satha II was a son of Ang Em. He ascended the throne in 1722. In 1736, Thommo Reachea III came back to Cambodia, and drove out him. Satha II sought refuge in Saigon.

In 1749, a civil war broke out in Cambodia. With the help of Vietnamese army, Satha II came back to Cambodia. However, he was drove out by Ang Sngoun. He died in Vietnam in the same year.

Satha II Varman Dynasty Born: 1702 Died: 1749
Regnal titles
Preceded by Ang Em	King of Cambodia; 1722–1736	Succeeded by Thommo Reachea III
Preceded by Ang Tong	King of Cambodia; 1749	Succeeded by Chey Chettha V
