= Uparaja =

Noble title

Uparaja (Note: also spelled Ouparaja (Burmese: ဥပရာဇာ [ṵpəjàzà]; Khmer: ឧបរាជ, UNGEGN: Ŏbâréach, ALA-LC: Uparāj [ʔoparaːc]; Thai: อุปราช, RTGS: Upparat; Lao: ອຸປຮາດ, Oupahat; also spelt Ouparath) is a noble title reserved for the viceroy in India and the Buddhist dynasties in Burma, Cambodia, Laos and Thailand, as well as some of their minor tributary kingdoms. It is ultimately from Sanskrit उपराज upa-rāja, equivalent to sub and rex respectively in Latin.

== India ==
The viceroy in the Indian Magadha Empire was titled Uparaja (lit. vice king).

== Burma ==
The Great Deputy King, in full Maha Uparaja Anaukrapa Ainshe Min, incorrectly interpreted as Crown Prince by Europeans, and addressed as His Royal Highness, was the single highest rank among the Min-nyi Min-tha, i.e. princes of the royal blood. It is shortened to Ainshe Min (အိမ်ရှေ့မင်း, IPA: [èiɰ̃ʃḛ mɪ́ɰ̃]).

However, the position was not reserved for the highest birth rank (if there is one, Shwe Kodaw-gyi Awratha, i.e. eldest son of the sovereign, by his chief Queen), nor did it carry a plausible promise of succession, which was usually only settled in an ultimate power struggle.

== Cambodia ==
The word Ouparach (Khmer: ឧបរាជ) is derived from both Sanskrit and Pali languages, literally means Vice King, who obtains the position following the crowned king. The full term of Ouparach in order to provide the proper honor is Samdach Preah Ouparach (Khmer: សម្តេចព្រះឧបរាជ) or Samdach Preah Moha Ouparach (Khmer: សម្តេចព្រះមហាឧបរាជ្យ). According to tradition of Kingdom of Cambodia, Samdach Preah Moha Ouparach positions as the supreme official controlling other high and low officials.

== Siam (Thailand) ==
Uparat (Thai: อุปราช; RTGS: Upparat), in full Phra Maha Upparat (พระมหาอุปราช), as pronounced in historical Siam, translates to viceroy. Front Palace (Thai: วังหน้า; RTGS: Wang Na), however, was the more usual designation, often referred to in English as Second King or Vice King.

The office was discontinued in 1876 by King Chulalongkorn (Rama V), following the Front Palace Crisis of 1874, in favour of the office of Crown Prince of Siam (Thai: สยามมกุฎราชกุมาร; RTGS: Sayammakutratchakuman). Note that those serving vice a king constitute a different office, that of regent or regency council.

== See also ==
- Burmese royal titles
- Thai royal ranks and titles
- Front Palace
- Chakri Dynasty
