= List of Buddhist temples in Cambodia =

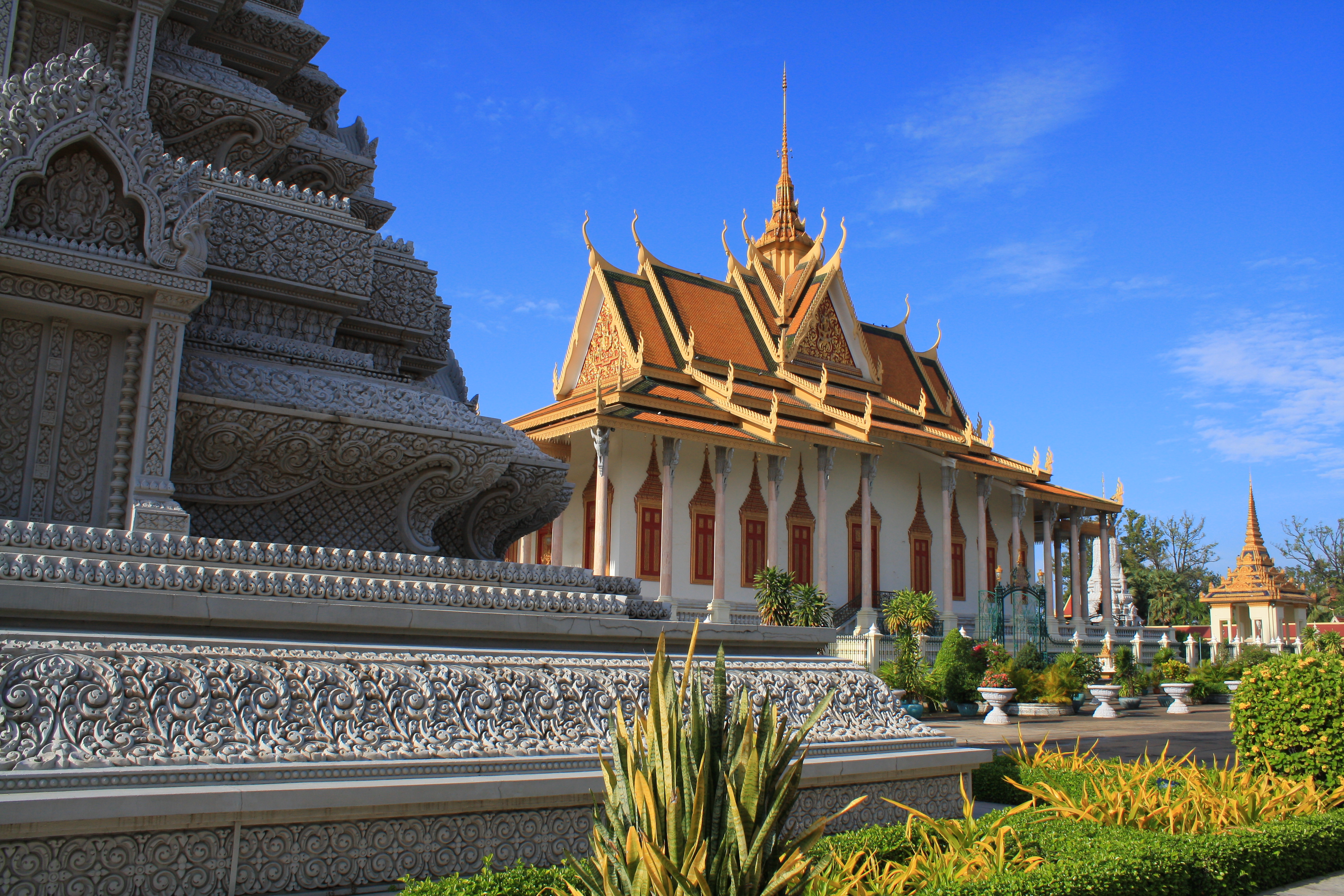
Wat Preah Keo Morokot

This is a list of Buddhist temples, monasteries, stupas, and pagodas in Cambodia for which there are Wikipedia articles, sorted by location.

Theravada Buddhism is the official religion of Cambodia, practiced by 95% of the population. Theravada Buddhist tradition is widespread and strong in all provinces, with an estimated 4,392 pagodas throughout the country. In Cambodia, the constitution states that "Buddhism is the state religion" and most of the people practice Theravada Buddhism.

== Kampong Cham ==
- Wat Moha Leap

== Kampong Thom Province ==
- Prasat Kuh Nokor

== Kampot Province ==
- Phnom Sorsia

== Kandai Province ==
- Wat Vihear Suor

== Phnom Penh ==
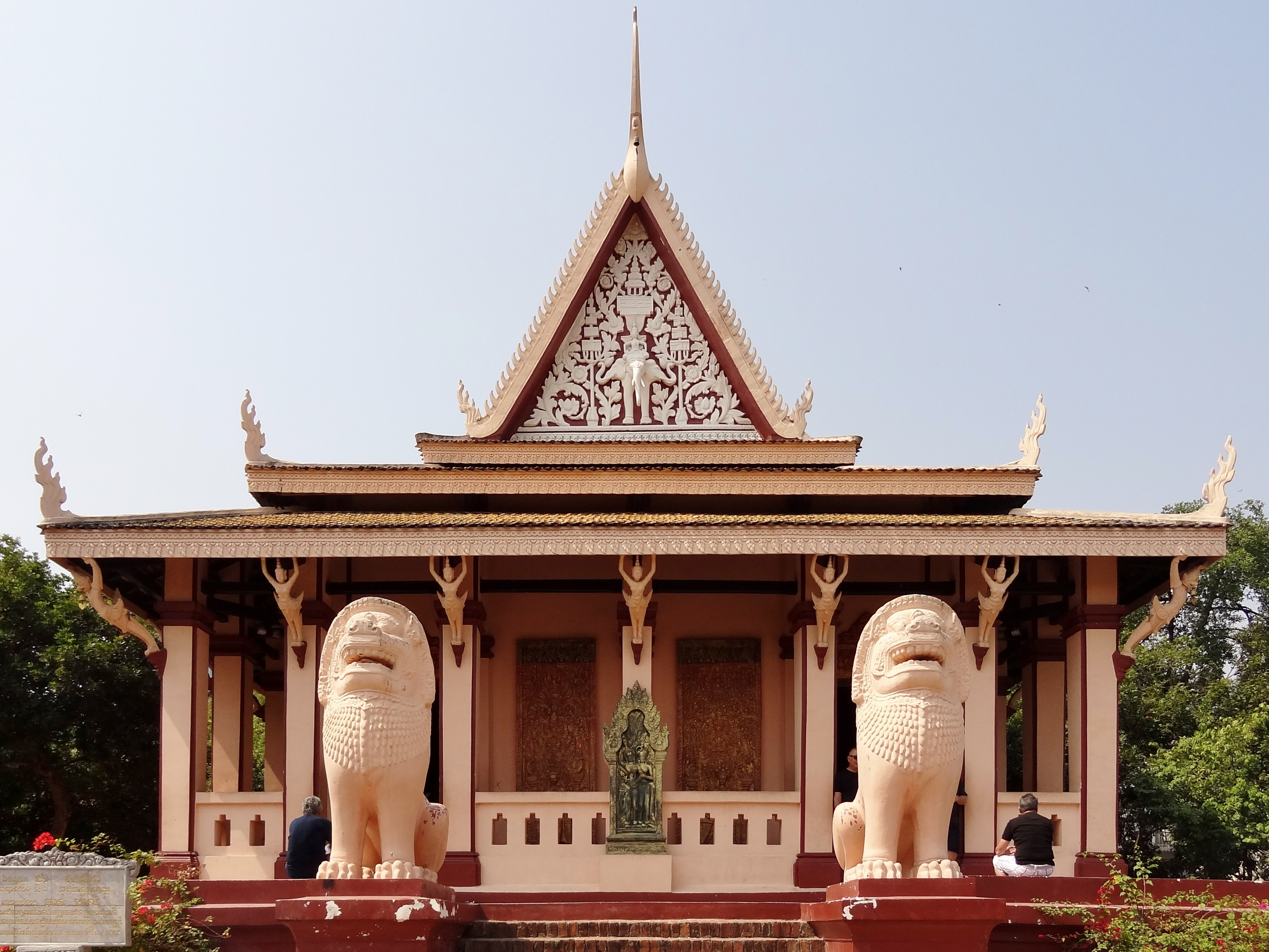
Wat Phnom

- Wat Botum
- Wat Langka
- Wat Moha Montrey
- Wat Ounalom
- Wat Phnom
- Wat Preah Keo (Silver Pagoda)
- Wat Saravan
- Wat Svay Pope

== Pursat Province ==
- Wat Bakan

== Siem Reap Province ==
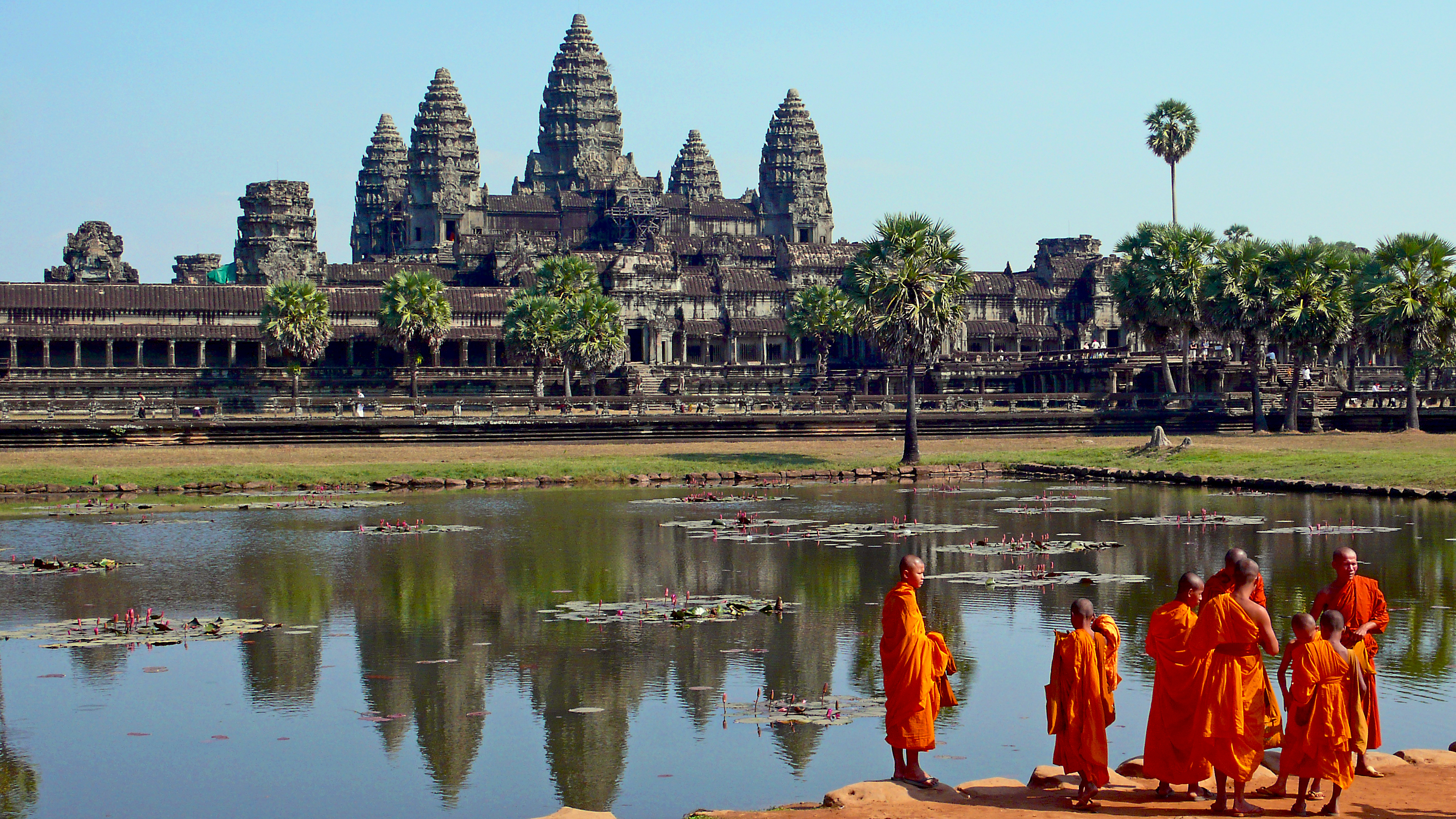
Angkor Wat

- Angkor Wat
- Banteay Kdei
- Baphuon
- Bayon
- Krol Ko
- Neak Pean
- Preah Khan
- Preah Palilay
- Ta Prohm
- Ta Som
- Tep Pranam

== See also ==
- Buddhism in Cambodia
- Supreme Patriarch of Cambodia
- Buddhist Institute, Cambodia
- Pchum Ben
- Dhammayietra
- Smot (chanting)
- Stupas in Cambodia
- Khmer architecture
- List of Buddhist temples
