= Sihanouk Boulevard =

Boulevard in Phnom Penh

Coordinates: 11°33′18″N 104°55′16″E

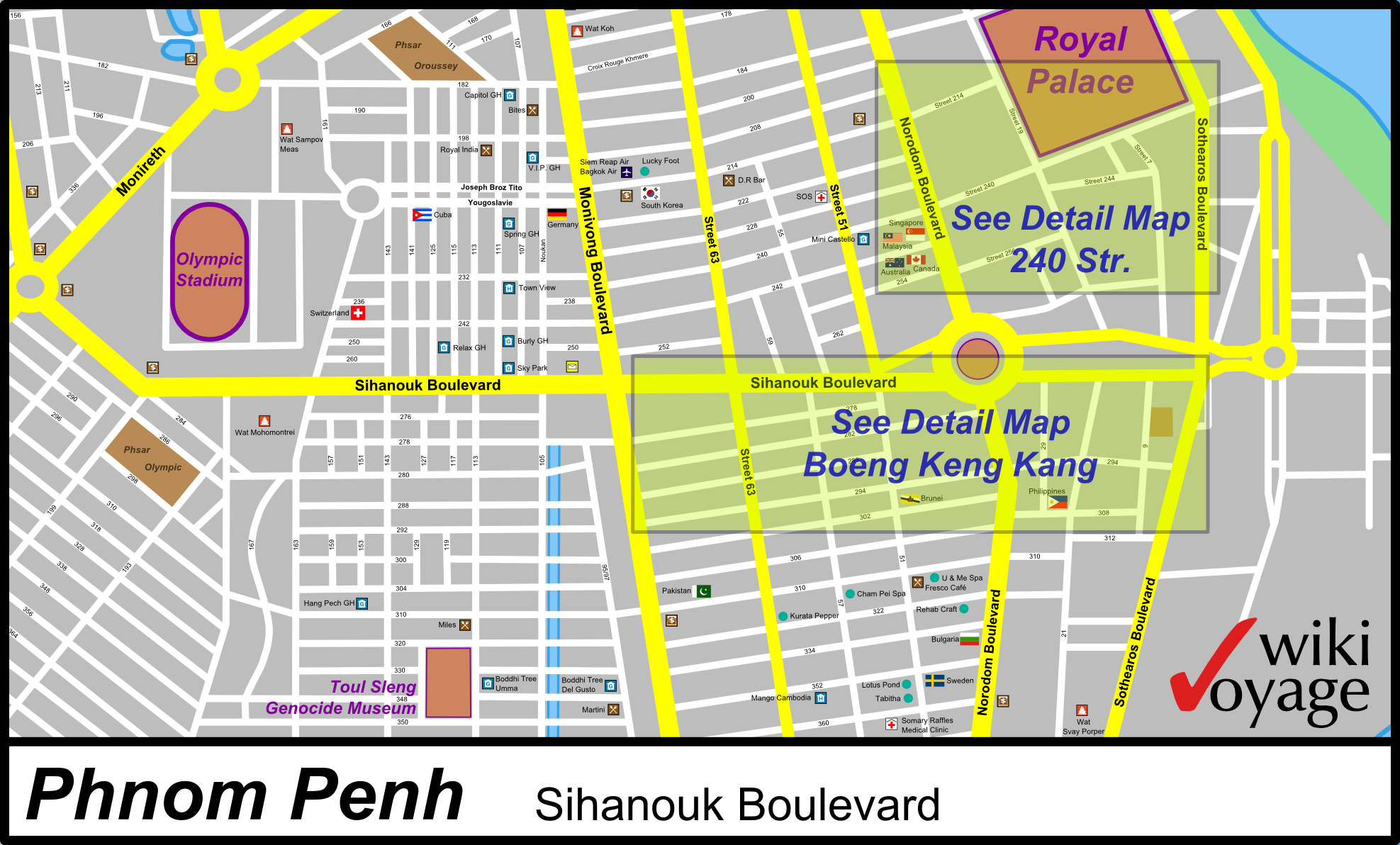
Phnom Penh Map showing Sihanouk Boulevard

Sihanouk Boulevard (Khmer: មហាវិថីព្រះសីហនុ, Mohavithei Preah Seihanu [mɔ.haː.ʋi.tʰəj prĕəh səj.ha.nuʔ]), or Preah Sihanouk Boulevard, is a central boulevard of Phnom Penh which is the capital of Cambodia. The boulevard crosses the city in an east–west direction. It is named in honour of the late King Norodom Sihanouk, one of the country's greatest kings.

It crosses with the east–west Norodom Boulevard at Independence Monument and near Wat Langka. It crosses Samdech Hun Sen Boulevard.

Wat Moha Montrey is located on the boulevard in the western area of the city. The Lucky Supermarket is located approximately 100 metres (110 yards) after it crosses with Monivong Boulevard which passes through the entire city in a north–south direction in the centre. The boulevard circles around Independence Monument, which is located just south of the Embassy of North Korea.
