= Barom Reameathibtei =

14th century Khmer king

Barom Reameathibtei (Khmer: បរមរាមាធិបតី, Paramarāmādhipatī; Thai: บรมรามาธิบดี, RTGS: Borom Ramathibodi; lit. 'Supreme Overlord Rama'), also known as Barom Reamea (Khmer: បរមរាមា; Thai: บรมรามา, RTGS: Borom Rama; lit. 'Supreme Rama') and Damkhat (Khmer: ដំខាត់; Thai: คำขัด, RTGS: Khamkhat), was a king of the Khmer Empire during the 14th century.

Damkhat was a son of the younger sister of Srei Soriyovong (ស្រីសុរិយោវង្ស), a king of the Khmer Empire, which the Ayutthaya Kingdom had previously attacked and made its vassal state. The Khmer Chronicle of Ang Eng (KCAE) states that Srei Soriyovong had one elder sister and one younger sister. The elder sister gave birth to a son called In Reachea (ឥន្ទរាជា), or In Racha (อินทราชา) in Thai. The younger sister gave birth to two sons, Damkhat and Kaeo Fa (แก้วฟ้า), respectively. Srei Soriyovong intended to abdicate in favour of his eldest grandson, In Reachea. Damkhat then killed In Reachea. Srei Soriyovong later declared a senior noble titled Khun Thep Montri (ขุนเทพมนตรี) the heir to the throne. Damkhat also killed Khun Thep Montri. Srei Soriyovong therefore handed over the throne to Damkhat.

The Vamn Juon Royal Chronicle of Cambodia (VJ) states that he ascended the throne in 724 LE, corresponding to 1906 BE (1363/64 CE). The Royal Chronicle of Great Kings That Reigned in the Kingdom of Cambodia Consecutively (RCGK) states that it was 728 LE (1366/67 CE). And the Document on Great Khmer Figures (DGKF) says it was 731 LE, corresponding to 1913 BE and 1369 CE.

After he ascended the throne, Damkhat declared independence from Ayutthaya and marched his troops to attack Ayutthaya twice. According to KCAE, in an unstated year, he marched to Chanthabun (จันทบูร; "Moon City"; an old name of Chanthaburi) and Bang Khang (บางคาง; an old name of Prachin Buri) before removing a great many locals to his capital, Angkor Thom. As he was marching back to Angkor Thom, some Cham people came and attacked Chaktomok town. He then rushed to Chaktomok and defeated the Cham. In another unstated year, Damkhat and his younger brother, Kaeo Fa, led their troops to attack Ayutthaya again. They attacked border cities of Ayutthaya without success. They then ceased the campaign and returned home.

KCAE says that after arriving in Angkor Thom, Damkhat was poisoned by his concubine and died. He was succeeded by his younger brother, Kaeo Fa, who took the title of Thomma Saok Reach (ធម្មាសោករាជ). RCGK states that Kaeo Fa became king in 732 LE (1370/71 CE). DGKF says it was 735 LE, corresponding to 1917 BE and 1373 CE. And VJ says it was 775 LE, corresponding to 1957 BE (1414/15 CE).

Damkhat had a son, Ponhea Yat (ពញាយ៉ាត), the last king of the Khmer Empire.

== Bibliography ==
- Phakdikham, Santi (2011-07-09). "Khamen Rop Thai Samai Ayutthaya Nai Lakthan Prawattisat Kamphucha" เขมรรบไทยสมัยอยุธยาในหลักฐานประวัติศาสตร์กัมพูชา [Khmer–Thai Wars in Cambodian Historical Sources]. Archdiocese of Bangkok (in Thai). Bangkok: Matichon. Archived from the original on 2015-07-12.
- Prachum Phongsawadan Chabap Kanchanaphisek Lem Sip Song ประชุมพงศาวดาร ฉบับกาญจนาภิเษก เล่ม ๑๒ [Golden Jubilee Collection of Historical Archives, Volume 12] (in Thai). Bangkok: Fine Arts Department of Thailand. 2006. ISBN 9749528476.

Regnal titles
Preceded by Srei Soriyovong	King of Khmer Empire (a) 724 LE (1363/64 CE) to 775 LE (1414/15 CE); or (b) 728 LE (1366/67 CE) to 732 LE (1370/71 CE); or (c) 731 LE (1369 CE) to 735 LE (1373 CE)	Succeeded by Thomma Saok
