= Ponhea Yat =

15th-century King of the Khmer Empire

Ponhea Yat Barom Reachea I
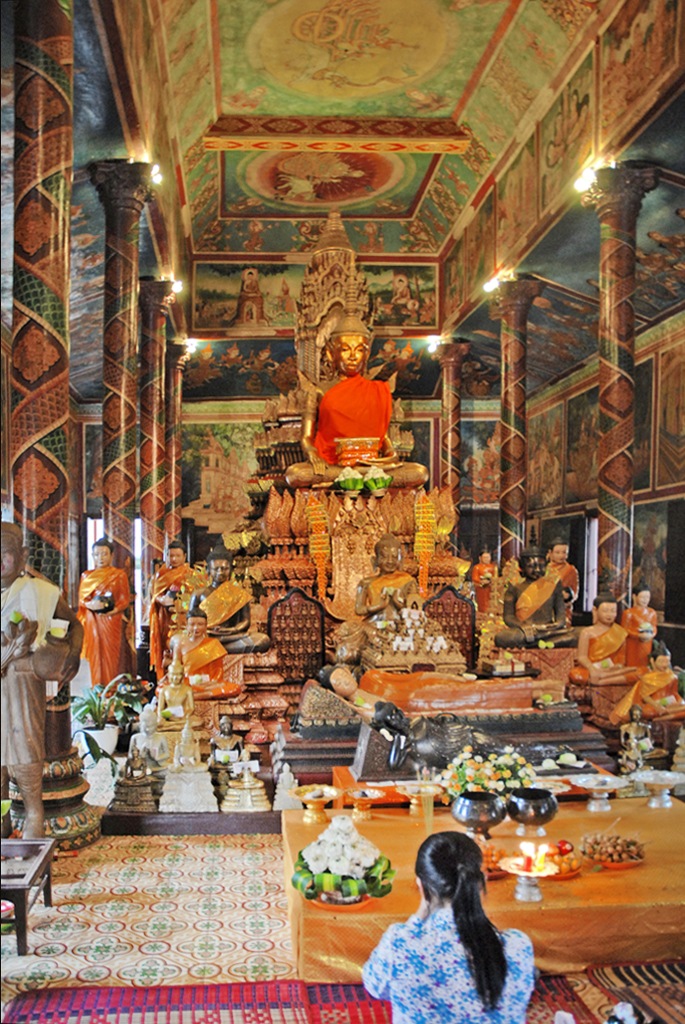
- Stupa containing the ashes of Ponhea Yat.

King of the Khmer Empire
- Reign: 1394–1463
- Predecessor: Ponhea Prek
- Successor: Himself, as King of Cambodia

King of Cambodia
- Reign: 1431–1463
- Predecessor: Himself, as King of the Khmer Empire
- Successor: Noreay Reachea
- Born: c. 1390; Yasodharapura, Khmer Empire (now in Siem Reap, Cambodia)
- Died: 1463 (aged 72–73); Krong Chaktomuk, Cambodia
- Burial: Wat Phnom
- Spouse: Sri Sraniem; Tevi; Kesar
- Issue: Noreay Reachea; Srey Reachea; Thommo Reachea
- Father: Sri Soryovong
- Religion: Buddhism

Ponhea Yat (Khmer: ពញាយ៉ាត, UNGEGN: Pônhéa Yat, ALA-LC: Bañā Y″āt [ˌpɔɲiəˈjaːt]; c. 1394 – 1463), also known as Borom Reachea I (Khmer: បរមរាជាទី១, UNGEGN: Bârômôréachéa ti 1, ALA-LC: Paramarājā dī 1 [ˌɓɑrɔmriəˈciə tiː muay]), was the last king of the Khmer Empire and the first Khmer king of the post-Angkor period.

Ponhea Yat complained to the Yongle Emperor in 1408 and 1414 of raids by the Champa King Indravarman VI. He dispatched Kun Si-li Ren-nong-la to visit China.

He was forced to flee Yasodharapura in 1431 as it was indefensible against attack by the Siamese, resettling first in Basan (Srey Santhor), but after it became flooded, fled to Chaktomuk (now part of "Phnom Penh").

In Phnom Penh, the king ordered the land to be built up to protect it from flooding, and a palace to be built. During his reign, he also ordered the construction of six Buddhist monasteries around the city, and his remains are housed in a stupa behind the Wat Phnom.

King Ponhea Yat was succeeded on his death by his first son Noreay Reachea, who reigned until 1469 and who was succeeded in turn by Ponhea Yat's second son, Srey Reachea.

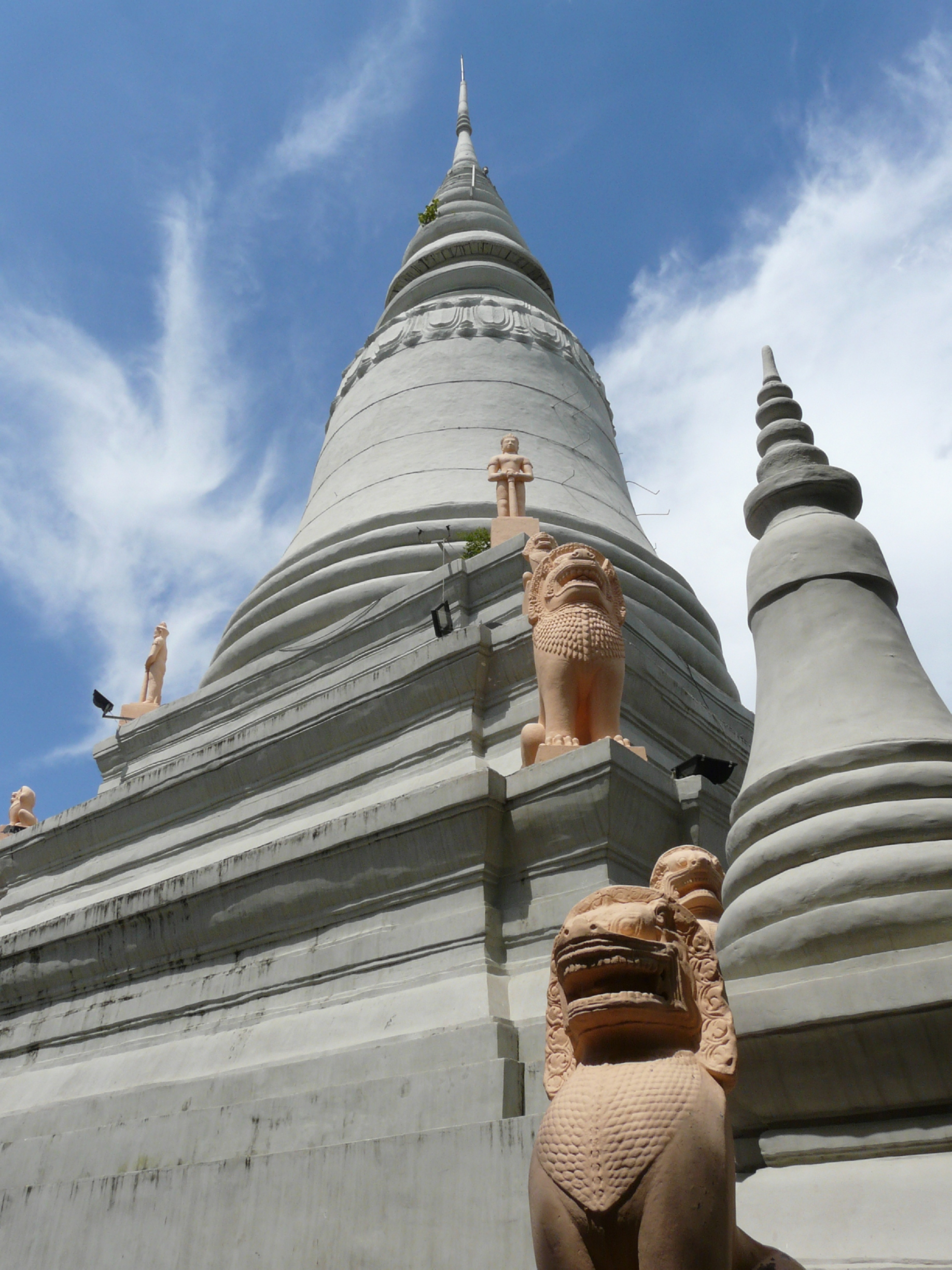
Stupa of Ponhea Yat at Wat Phnom.

== Family ==
Ponhea Yat, the third son of Thommasaok Reachea, succeeded his father and was named "Borom Reachea I" and was crowned king with three concubines. First, Concubine Buppha Devi had a son named Noreay Reamea as her first son. Second, Concubine Sisangam was the sole concubine of the Siamese king Intharachathirat (In), who was defeated by Ponhea Yat in Angkor. Sisangam had two sons named Srei Reachea and Srei Soriyoatey as his second and third sons. Third, Concubine Potumkesar had a son named Dhamma Reachea II as his fourth son. All four of his sons succeeded him, and these four sons divided the Khmer territory into three large parts to rule individually until the outbreak of internal wars and even more so among themselves after Ponhea Yat's father died.

== Liberation of Angkor ==
After Ponhea Yat fled from Angkor, he went to establish a fortress at Toul Bashan in Srei Santor district ( Kampong Cham province ) for three years. He then sent 12 spies to disguise themselves as servants in the Angkor royal palace to secretly assassinate the Siamese king Intharachathirat (In) at that time. After the successful mission to assassinate the Siamese king, Ponhea Yat led an army of approximately 70,000 to liberate Angkor from the hands of the Siamese. He returned in 1388 and proclaimed his second reign, where he was given the title " Preah Barom Reachea ". Seeing that the treasures of Angkor had been collected by the Siamese, Angkor was badly damaged, including the city walls, and there was a lot of money spent on repairs, and in order to avoid further Siamese threats to Angkor, he decided to leave Angkor and move his capital to Toul Basan for 12 years. He also encountered a major flood crisis in the year of Rong, which flooded the capital of Toul Bashan. He also decided to move his capital again to the Chaktomuk area (currently Phnom Penh ) in 1400. He ruled in Chaktomuk for 16 years. He also declared a change of reign to the Chaktomuk era in 1416. of the 1st century BC, and he reigned in the capital city of Chaktomuk until 1432 of the 1st century BC, when he died. At that time, the royal council and cabinet decided to invite Preah Noreay Reamea, the eldest son, to succeed his father in the 1st century BC. During the reign of Ponhea Yat, the people lived in peace, with few notable outbreaks of war.

== Politics ==
=== Diplomacy ===
Ponhea Yat's diplomatic policy was to strengthen diplomatic ties with the Chinese kingdom of the Ming Dynasty, especially through trade via the Mekong River to bring in various goods to meet domestic needs. During his reign, it can be said that Cambodia had a strong economy.

=== Interior ===
The development of Mahayana Buddhism by Ponhea Yat , the king built a series of monasteries, including:Wat Botum, Wat Koh, Wat Langka, Wat Ounalom, And Wat Phnom. Buddhist monasteries played an important role in his reign, as they were a repository of knowledge, a library, and a museum of culture. In all periods, monasteries provided education in literature, mathematics, and other knowledge necessary for life. The monasteries were a refuge for poor students who could not afford to study in large schools. The monasteries were a refuge for orphans, the elderly, students, and children of the poor. A monastery can also serve as a hospital for the treatment of mental illness and a place for people of all classes, ages, and backgrounds to gather, regardless of color, nationality, social status, wealth, or religious beliefs.

== See also ==
- Fall of Angkor
- History of Cambodia
- Kings of Cambodia
- Chaktomuk

Regnal titles
Preceded by Thomma Saok	King of the Khmer Empire; 1394–1431	Succeeded by None
Preceded by None	King of Cambodia; 1431–1463	Succeeded by Noreay Reachea
