= Wat Saravan =

Wat in Phnom Penh, Cambodia

- វត្តសារាវ័ន
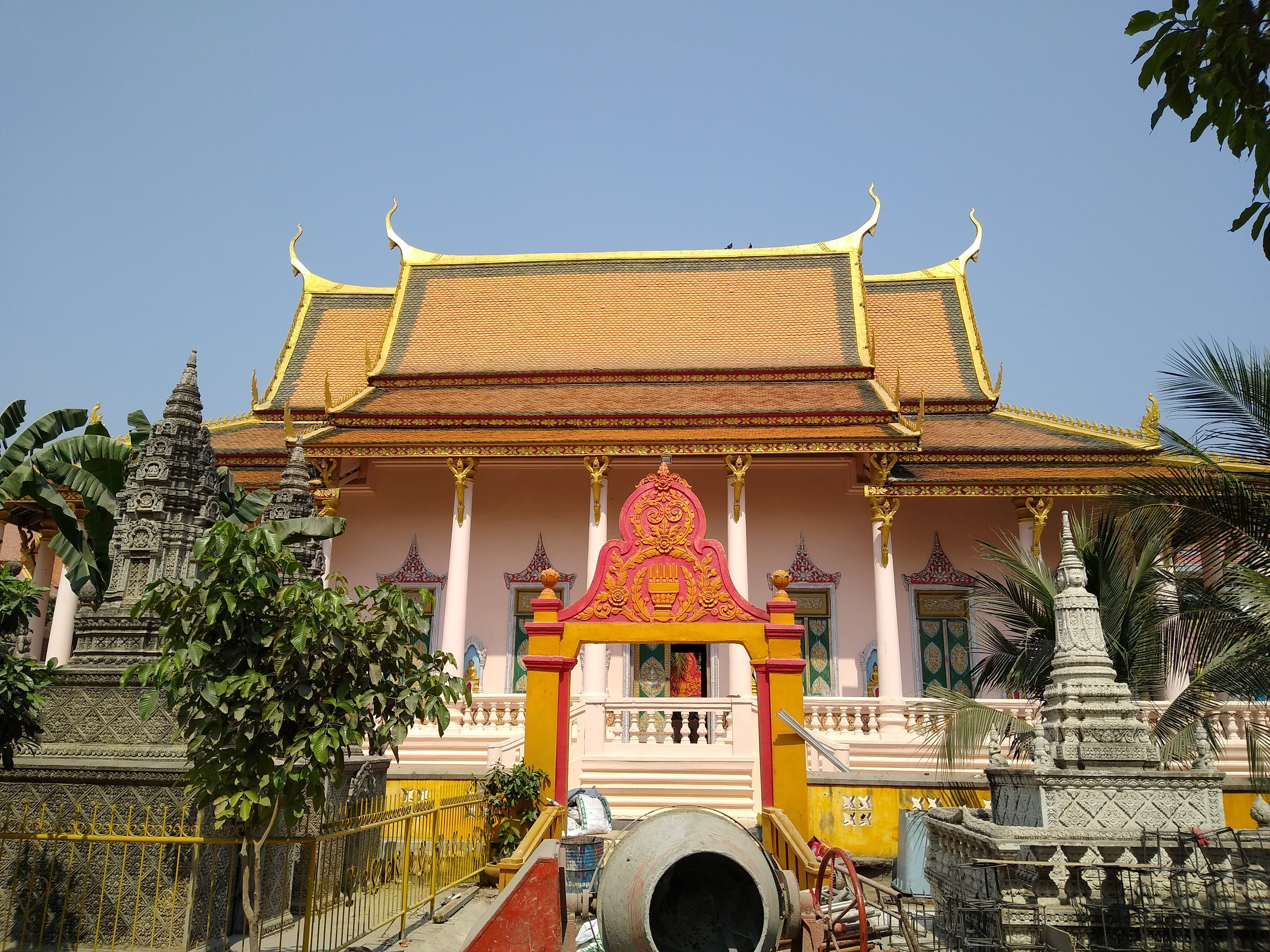
- Wat Saravan

- Location within Cambodia

Religion
- Affiliation: Theravada Buddhism
- District: Daun Penh
- Province: Phnom Penh

Location
- Country: Cambodia
- Coordinates: 11°33′58″N 104°55′36″E

Wat Saravan, officially Wat Saravan Techo (Khmer: វត្តសារាវ័នតេជោ, UNGEGN: Vôtt Saréavoănt Téchoŭ, ALA-LC: Vatt Sārāvănt Tejo, IPA: [ʋɔət saːraʋɔən tecoː]), is a wat in Phnom Penh, Cambodia. It is located to the northwest of the Royal Palace of Cambodia and southwest of Wat Ounalom. It is said to have over 3,400 manuscripts in what has been described as the largest library in the country.

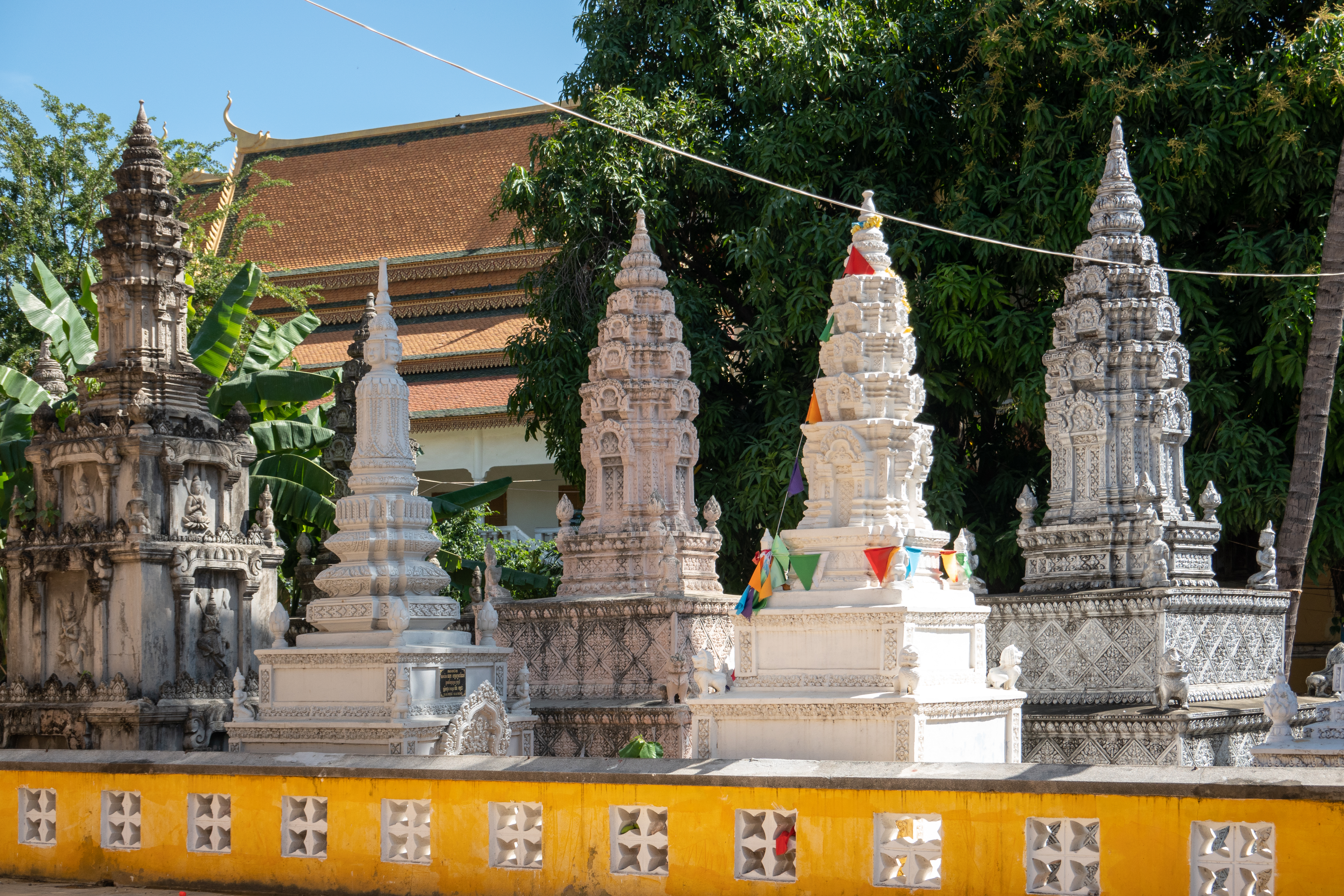

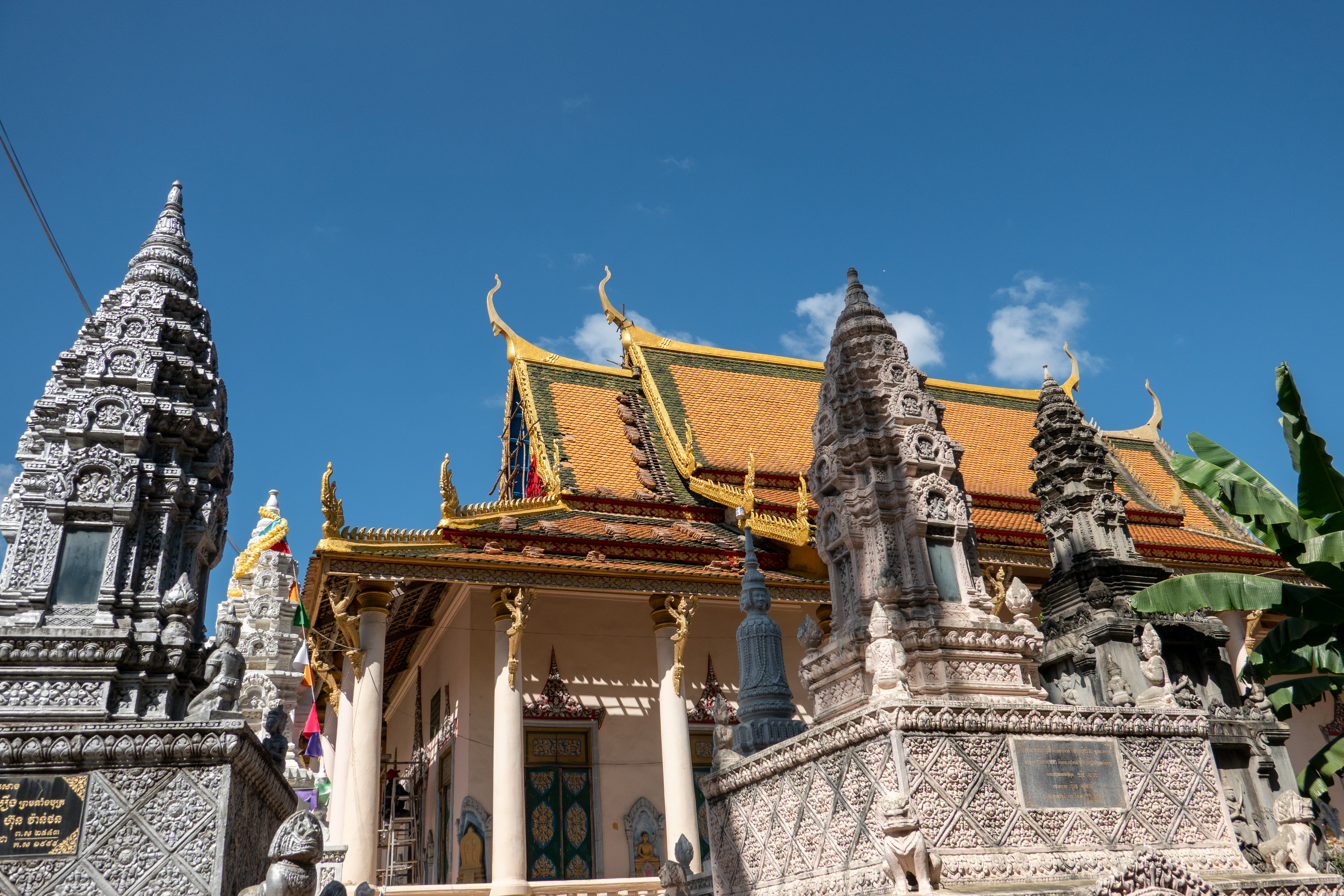

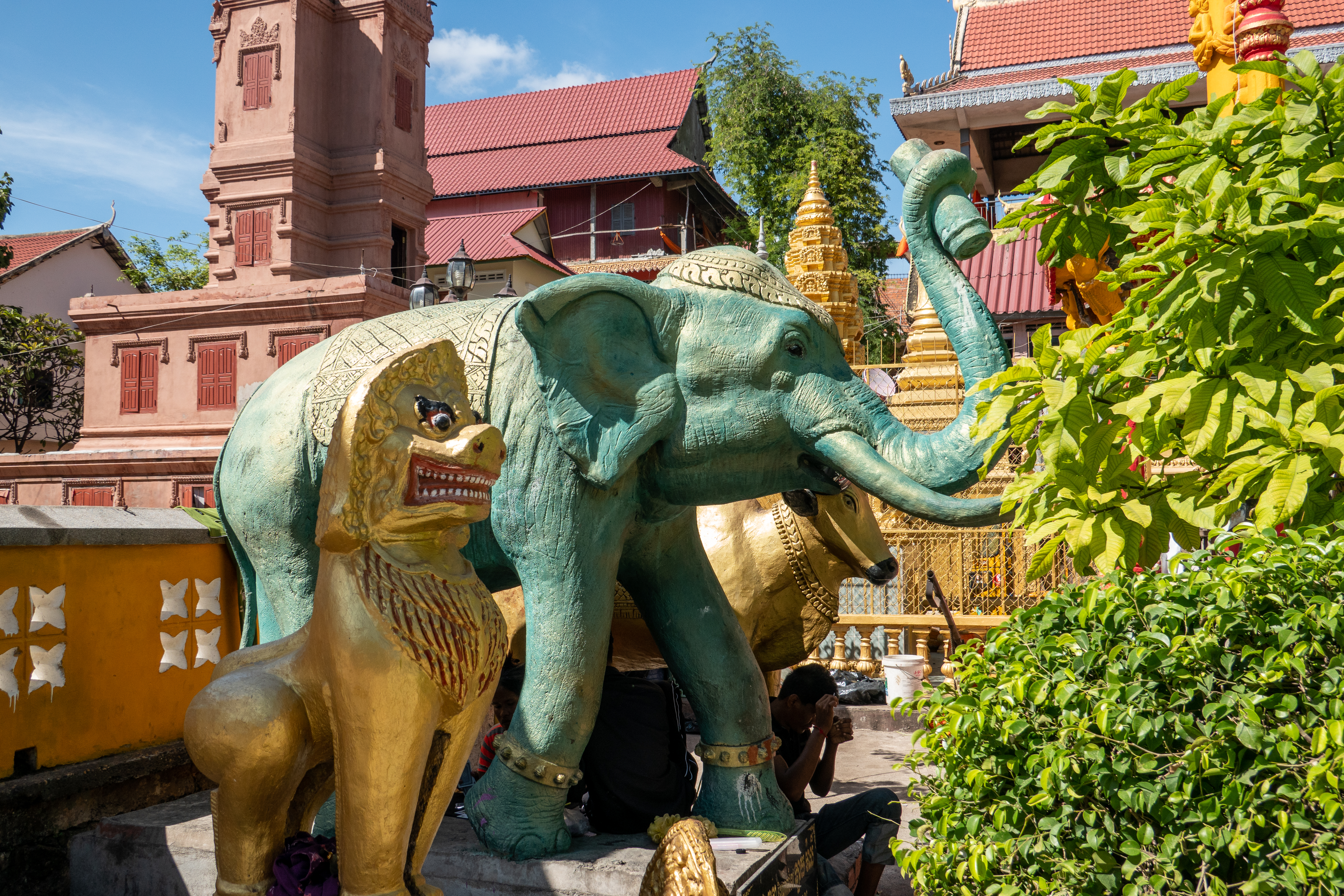

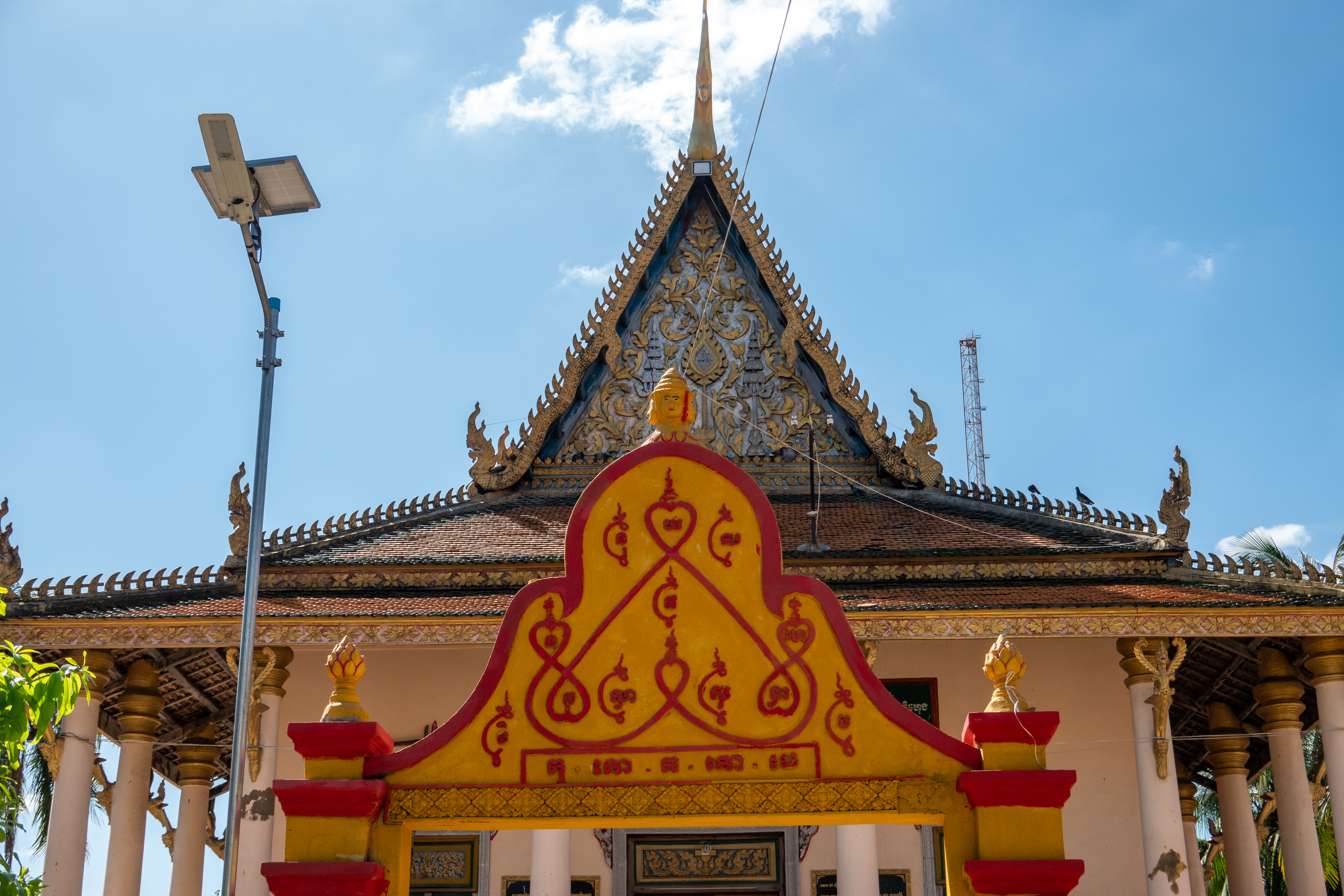

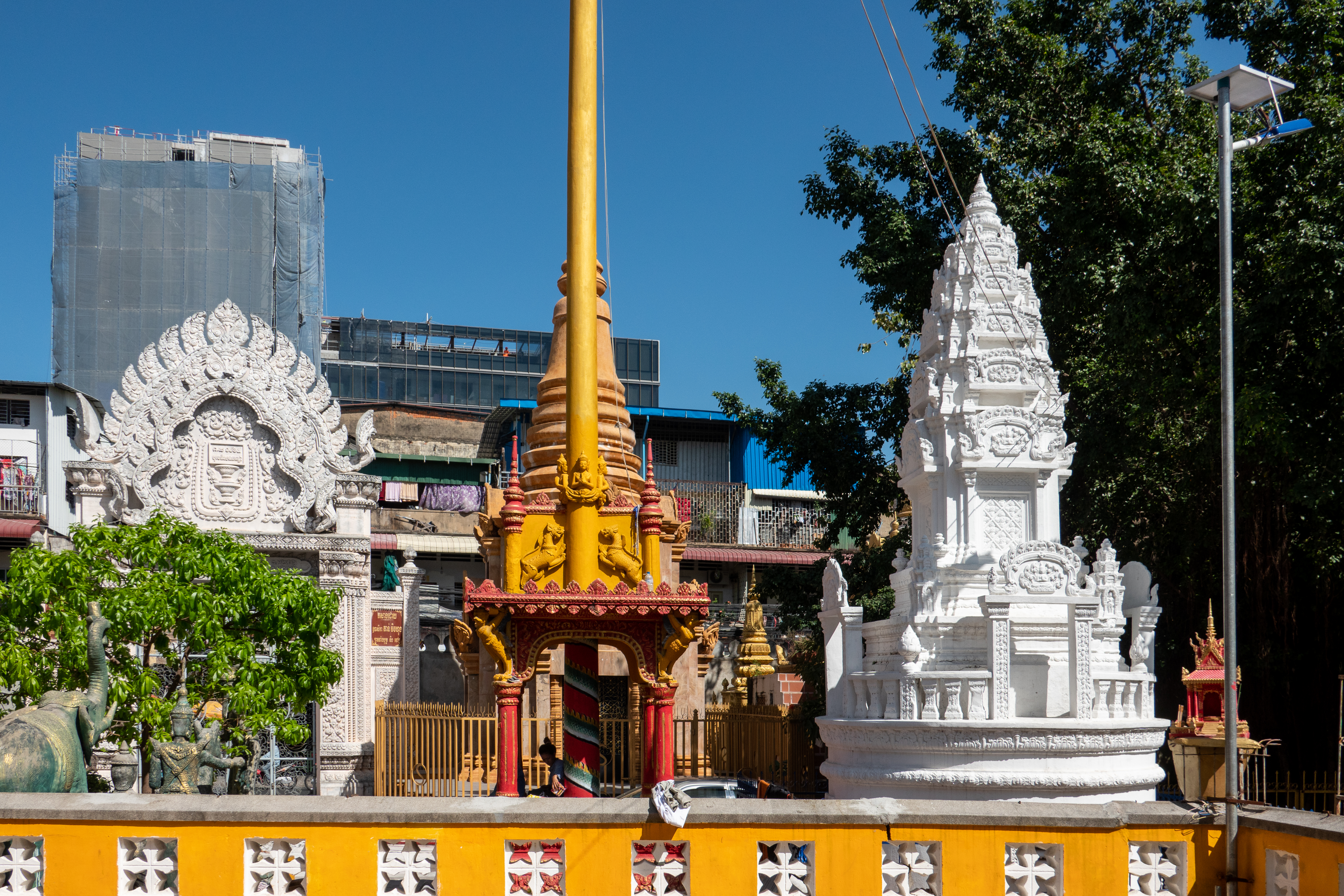

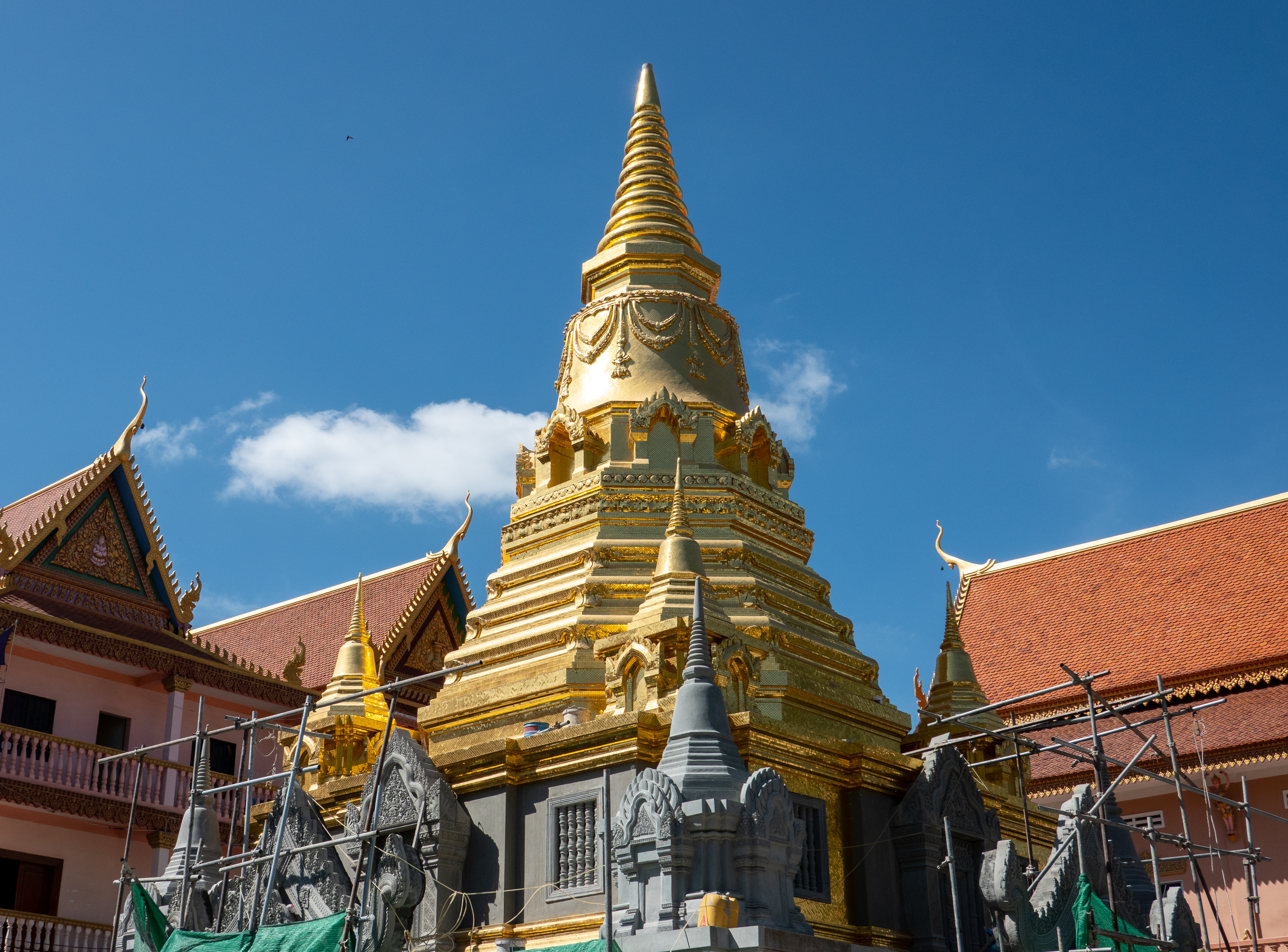

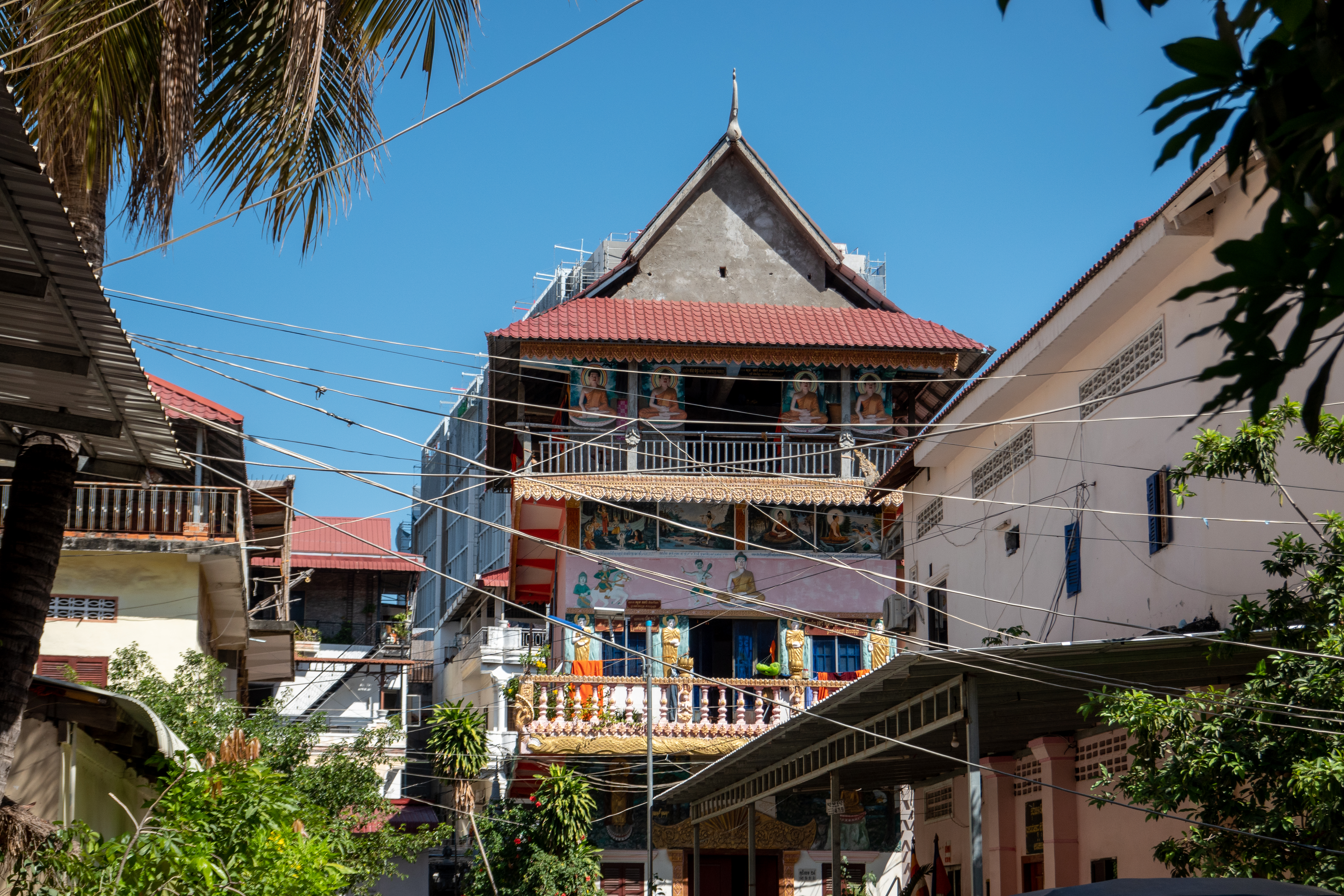
