= Siraniama =

Si Sa-ngiam
- Queen consort of Khmer Empire
- Spouse: Intharacha (Phra Nakhon In); Ponhea Yat
- Issue: Thommo Reachea I
- Dynasty: Suphannaphum (by marriage); Trasak Paem (by marriage)
- Father: Khun Song Phra In

Siraniama (Khmer script: ស៊ីសៈងាម, Sra Niem; Thai: ศรีเสงี่ยม, RTGS: Si Sa-ngiam, fl. 1410s or 1420s) was initially the consort of Entho Reachea, who ruled the Angkorian Empire after it was captured by his father Ramesuan. When Ponhea Yat assassinated Ramesuan and took over Angkor, he made her his queen.

It was said that after the assassination the Cambodians massacred the Siamese and opened the gates. When he entered the palace, Ponhea Yat found there a pretty Siamese woman who was crying. Interrogated by him, she lowered her head, and looking at him "with the tips of her eyes" replied that her name was Siraniama and that she was a Ayutthaya princess. Ponhea Yat found her so pretty that he married her.

She had at least two sons with Ponhea Yat, who ruled as Barom Reachea (II):

- Gamakatra, whom Ponhea Yat abdicated for in c. 1431 and who ruled as Noreay Reachea
- Dharmaraja
