= Srei Reachea =

King of Cambodia

King of Cambodia
- Reign: 1468-1485
- Coronation: 1437
- Predecessor: Noreay Reamea
- Successor: Srei Soriyoatey
- Born: 1437; Chaktomuk, Cambodia
- Died: 1485 (aged 48); Ayutthaya, Thailand
- Spouse: Kesar
- Issue: Prince Srei Soriyoateay; Prince Dhammareachea II
Names
- Preah Reach Ongkar Preah Srei Reachea
- House: Varman Dynasty
- Father: Ponhea Yat
- Mother: Concubine Sisangam
- Religion: Buddhism

Srei Reachea (Khmer: ស្រីរាជា, Srī Rājā; 1437–1485), was the Cambodian King ruled from 1468 to 1485. After the official coronation ceremony, in 1981 BE, 1437 AD,Maha Sakarach 1360. his full name was "Preah Reach Ongkar Preah Srei Reachea". He was the second son of Ponhea Yat, who led the Khmer army to conquer the western provinces from Siam and also laid siege to the capital of Ayutthaya, the capital of Siam.

Srei Reachea Chaktomuk period Born: 1437 Died: 1485
Regnal titles
Preceded by Ponhea Yat	King of Cambodia; 1437-1485	Succeeded by Srei Soriyoatey
