= Wat Moha Montrey =

Wat in Phnom Penh, Cambodia

- វត្តមហាមន្ត្រី
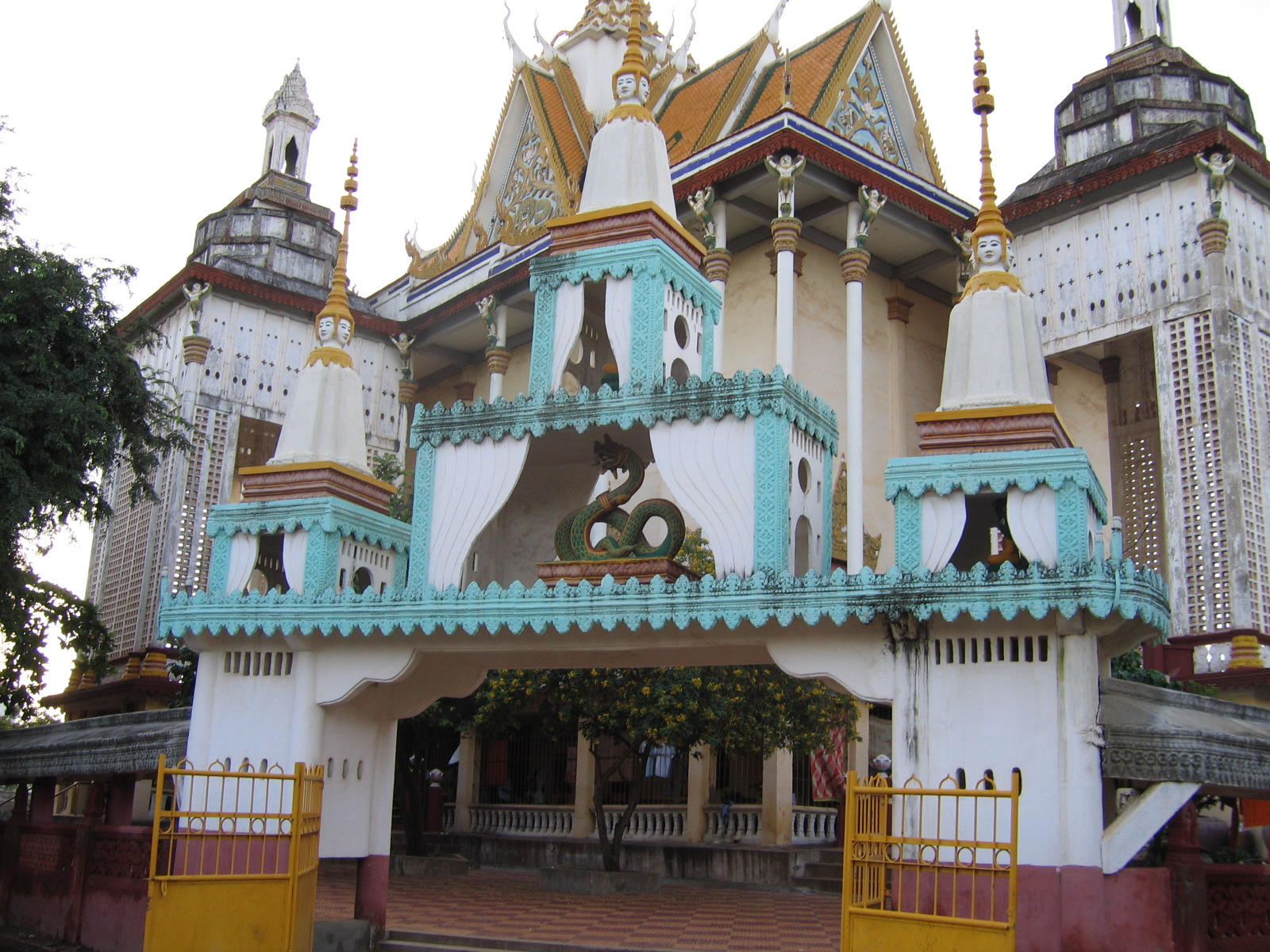
- Facade

- Location within Cambodia

Religion
- Affiliation: Theravada Buddhism
- Sect: Thammayut sector

Location
- Country: Cambodia
- Interactive map of Wat Moha Montrey
- Coordinates: 11°33′16″N 104°54′48″E

Architecture
- Completed: 1970

Wat Moha Montrey (Khmer: វត្តមហាមន្ត្រី, UNGEGN: Vôtt Môha Môntrei, ALA-LC: Vatt Mahā Mantrī [ʋɔət mɔhaː mɔntrəj]) is a wat located on Sihanouk Boulevard in Phnom Penh, Cambodia. Built in 1970, it was used by the Khmer Rouge between 1975 and 1979 as a storage house for rice and corn. The tower measures 35 metres in height. The temple was named in honor of Chakrey Ponn, King Monivong's War Minister. Moha Montrey means "The Great Minister".
