= Tep Pranam =

Temple with a giant seated Buddha in Cambodia

- ប្រាសាទទេពប្រណម្យ
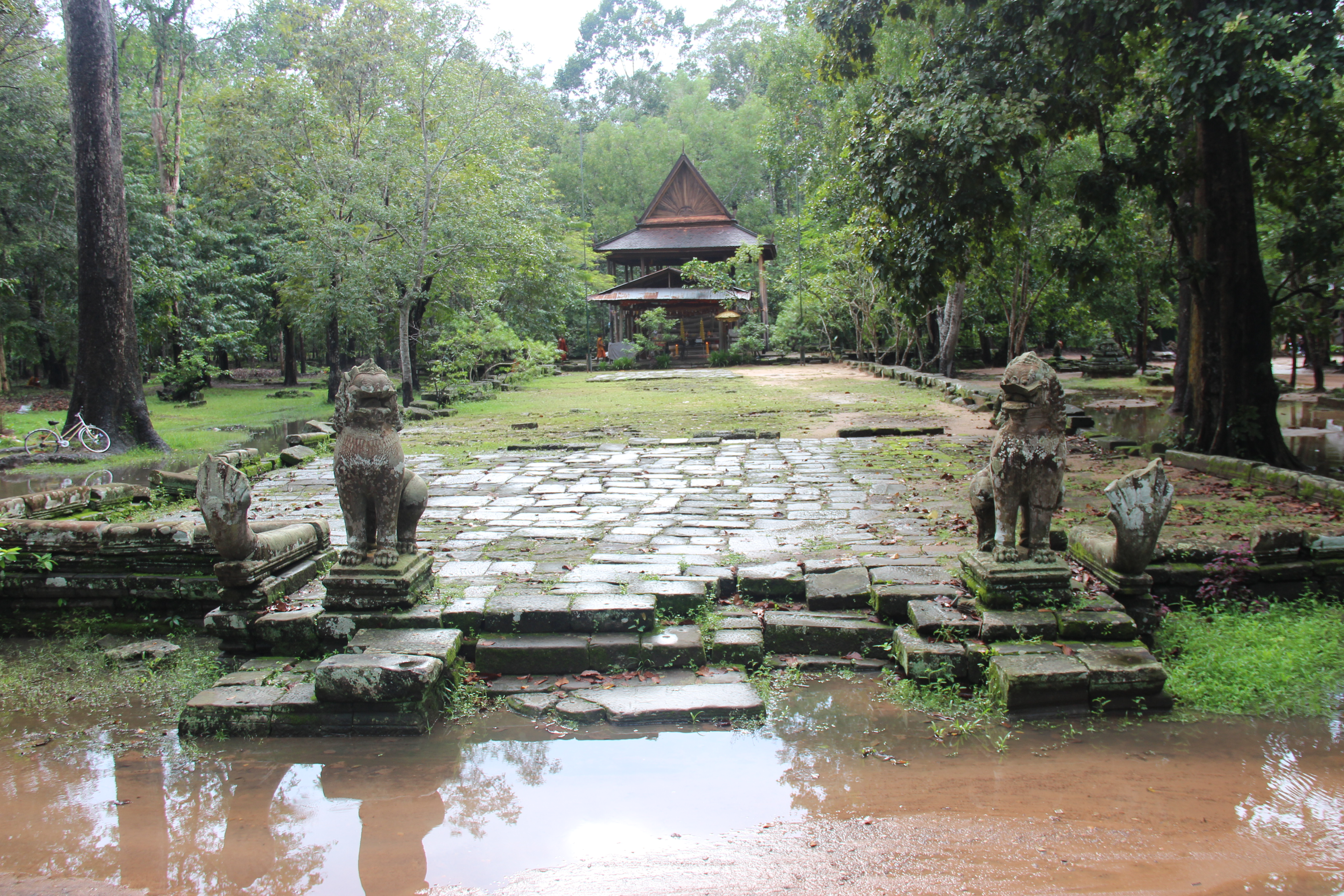
- East entrance and the central sanctuary

- Location in Cambodia

Religion
- Affiliation: Buddhism
- Province: Siem Reap

Location
- Location: Angkor Thom
- Country: Cambodia
- Coordinates: 13°26′54″N 103°51′27″E

Architecture
- Completed: Circa 16th century

Tep Pranam (Khmer: ប្រាសាទទេពប្រណម្យ) is a temple with a giant seated Buddha, built from sandstone blocks is still worshiped here. The interior of the figure re-uses many stone blocks while the head appears somewhat later.

== Plan ==
To the north of the Terrace of the Leper King and the Royal palace, the image is approached from the east along a 75m laterite causeway, 8m wide. This causeway ends on the west in a terrace with double sema (Buddhist boundary markers) at the corners and on the axes. The building housing the image would have been in wood, long since disappeared and was constructed on a cruciform foundation.

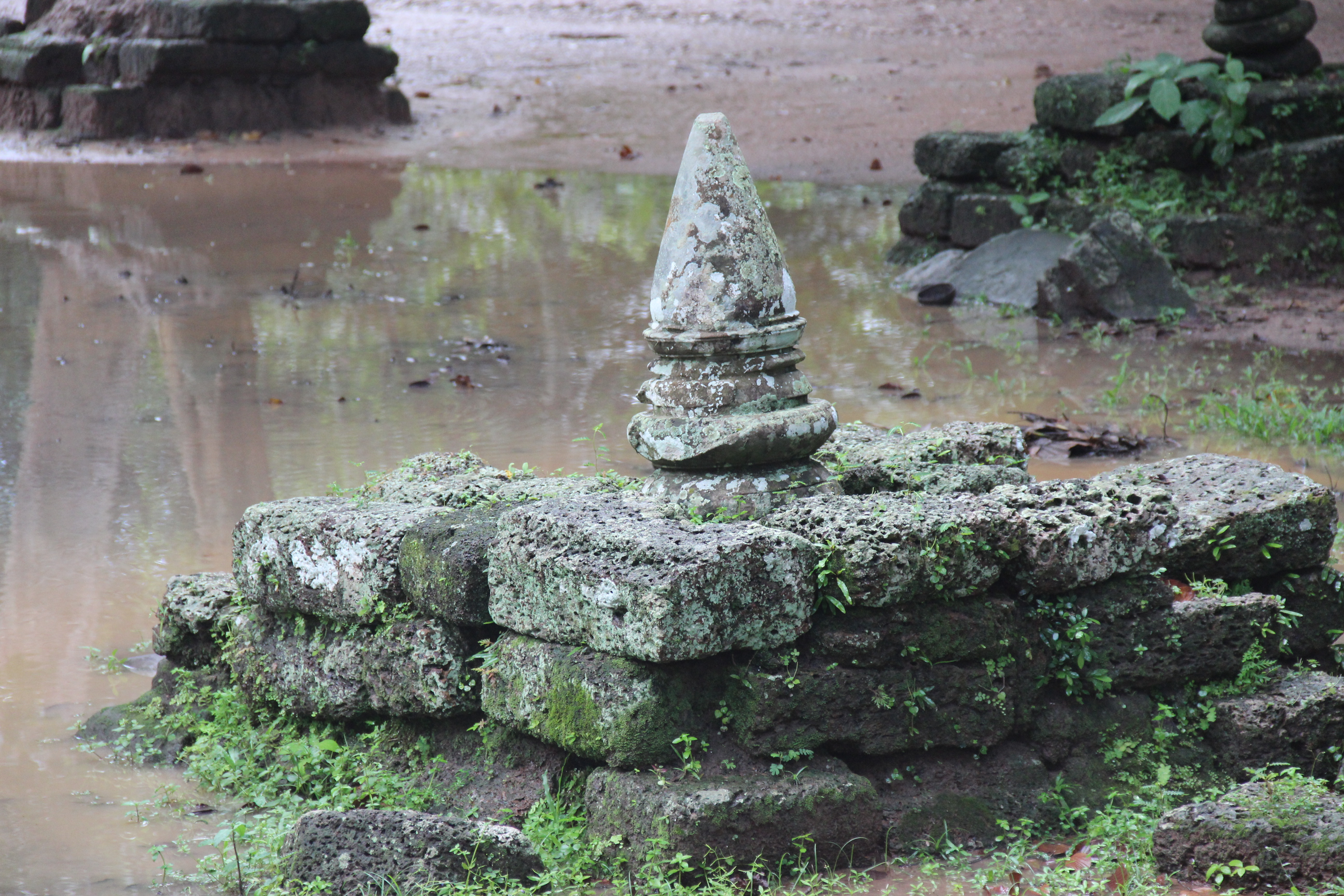

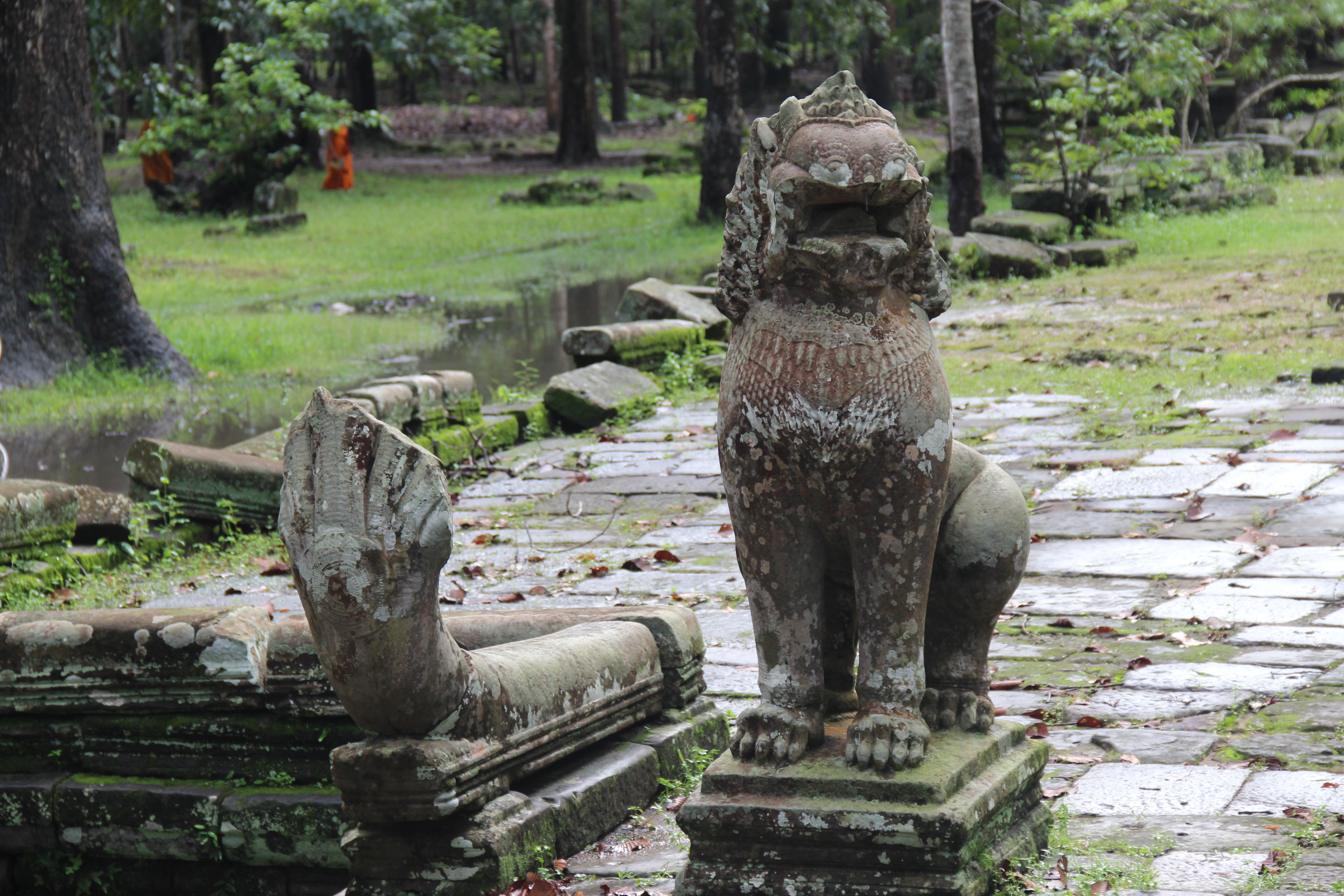

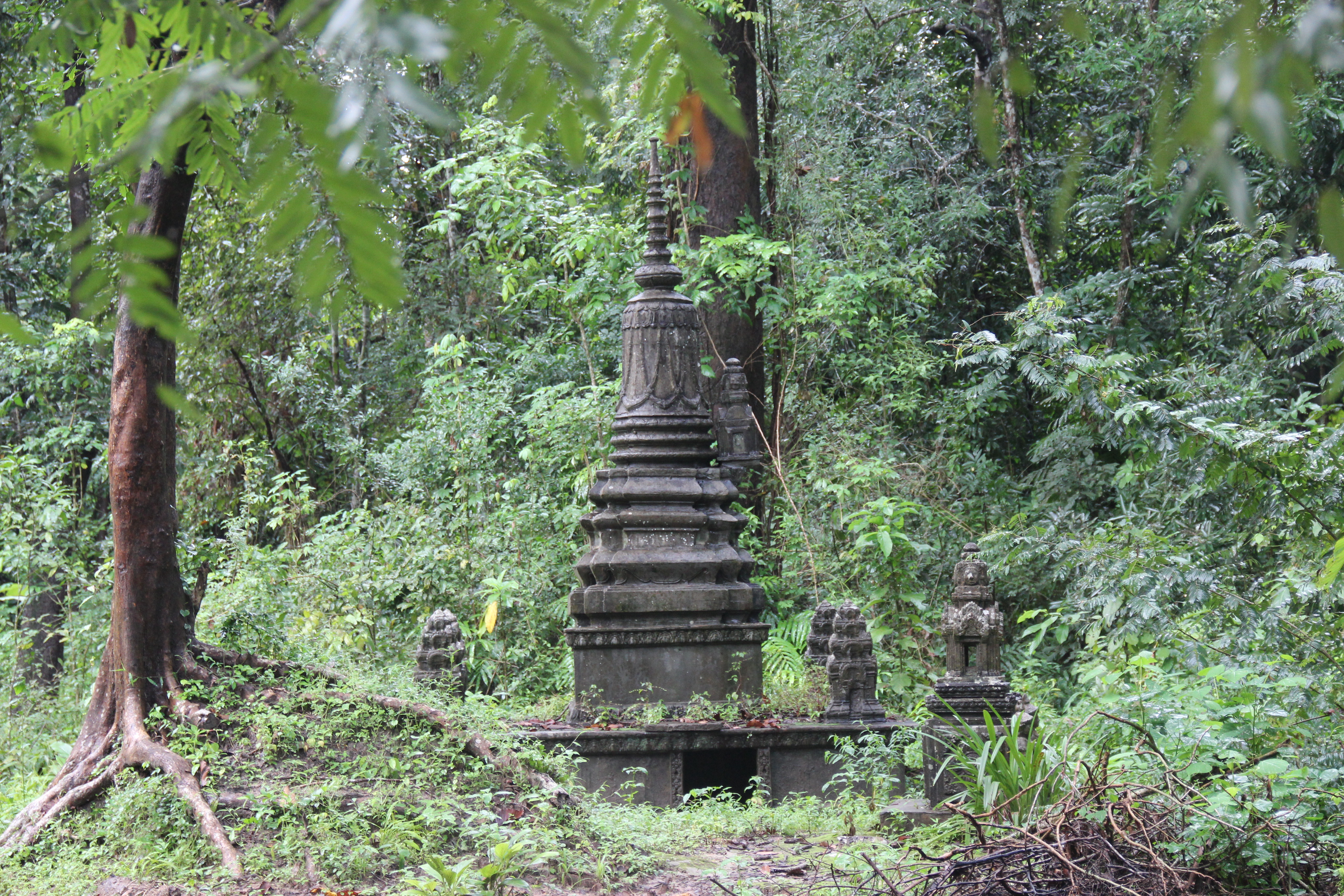

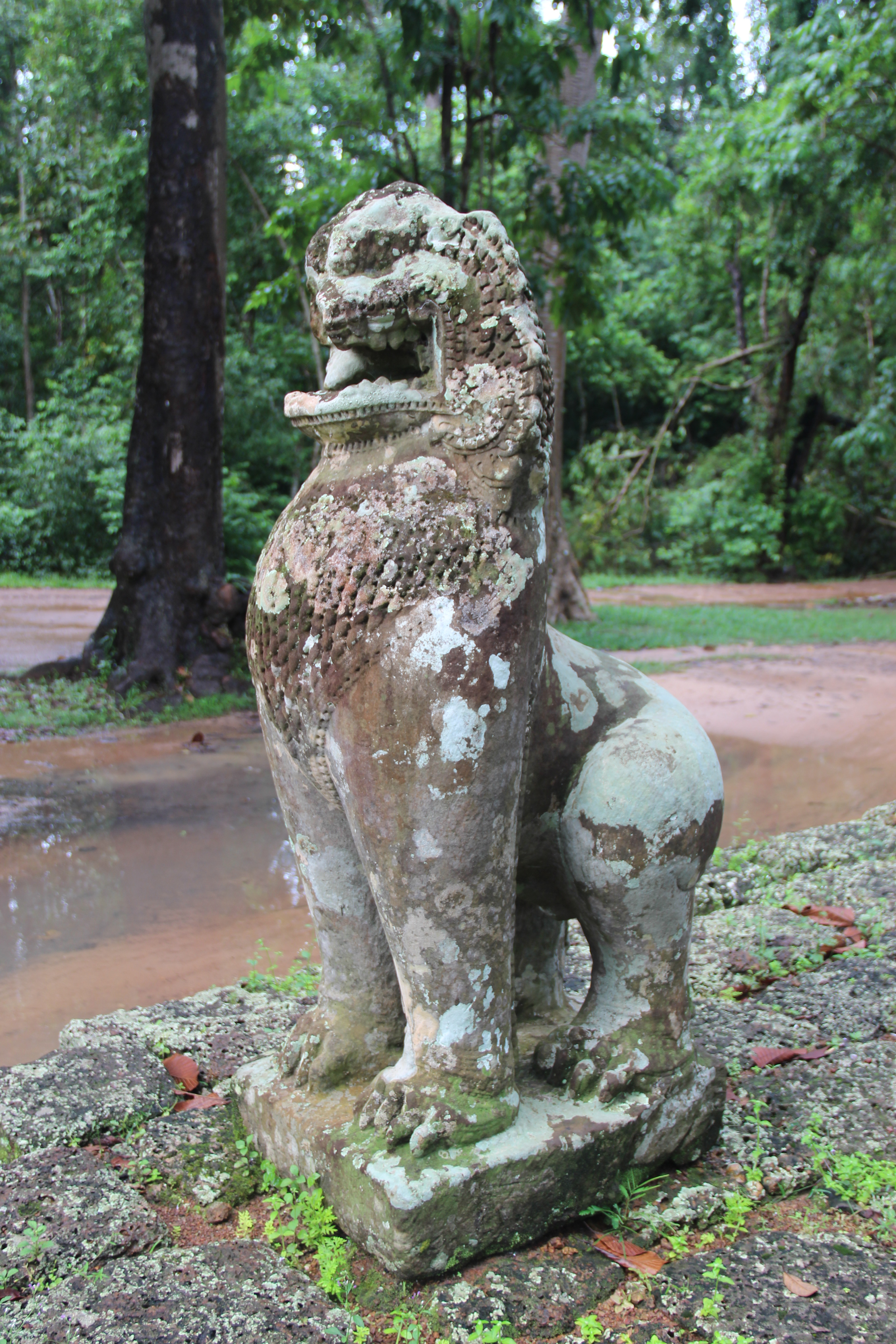
