= Wat Langka =

Buddhist temple in Phnom Penh, Cambodia

- វត្តលង្កា
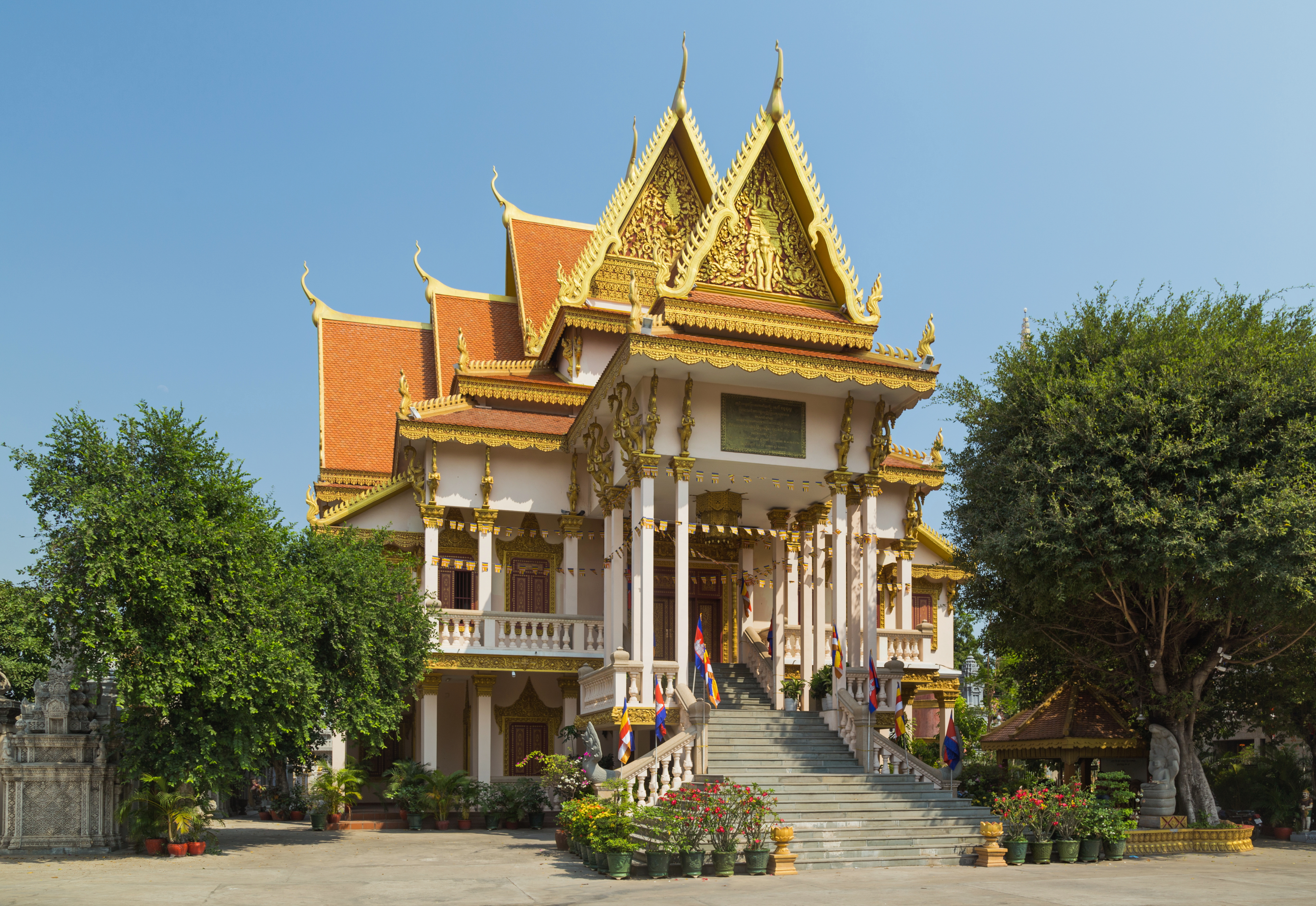
- Main temple of Wat Langka

- Location within Cambodia

Religion
- Affiliation: Theravada Buddhism
- District: Chamkar Mon
- Province: Phnom Penh

Location
- Country: Cambodia
- Interactive map of Wat Langka
- Coordinates: 11°33′20.69″N 104°55′38.34″E

Wat Langka (Khmer: វត្តលង្កា, UNGEGN: Vôtt Lôngka, ALA-LC: Vatt Langkā, IPA: [ʋɔət laŋkaː]) is a wat (Buddhist temple) located in Phnom Penh, Cambodia. It is one of the five ancient pagodas in Phnom Penh and was built in B.E. 1985 (A.D. 1442). The temple was originally constructed as a place of refuge and for the safekeeping of the Tripiṭaka, as well as a meeting place for Khmer and Sri Lankan monks. To commemorate this gathering, the pagoda was named Wat Langka. The temple is located southwest of the Independence Monument, near Sihanouk Blvd. and Street 51.

According to the Cambodian Royal Chronicles, Ponhea Yat—the founder of Phnom Penh—restored Wat Phnom Don Penh (វត្តភ្នំដូនពេញ) and built several other temples. The chronicles state:

The Grand Royal Palace was constructed to the southeast of Wat Phnom. The King ordered the digging of canals, the raising of earth, and the construction of roads and temples to beautify the city. The great stupa on top of the hill, located behind the main sanctuary, was built by the King to enshrine bronze Buddha statues facing the four directions. He also ordered the construction of monasteries around Wat Phnom, including Wat Langka for housing the Tripiṭaka, Wat Ounalom, and Wat Preah Buddhagosachar (Wat Chendom Daek – Wat Chin Ti Lek).

Three temples shared corresponding names—Wat Koh, Wat Langka, and Wat Preah Buddhagosachar—relating to the story of Buddhaghosa, who copied the scriptures from Sri Lanka.

During the Khmer Rouge regime, Wat Langka was used as a storage warehouse, which helped it avoid complete destruction.

== Images ==
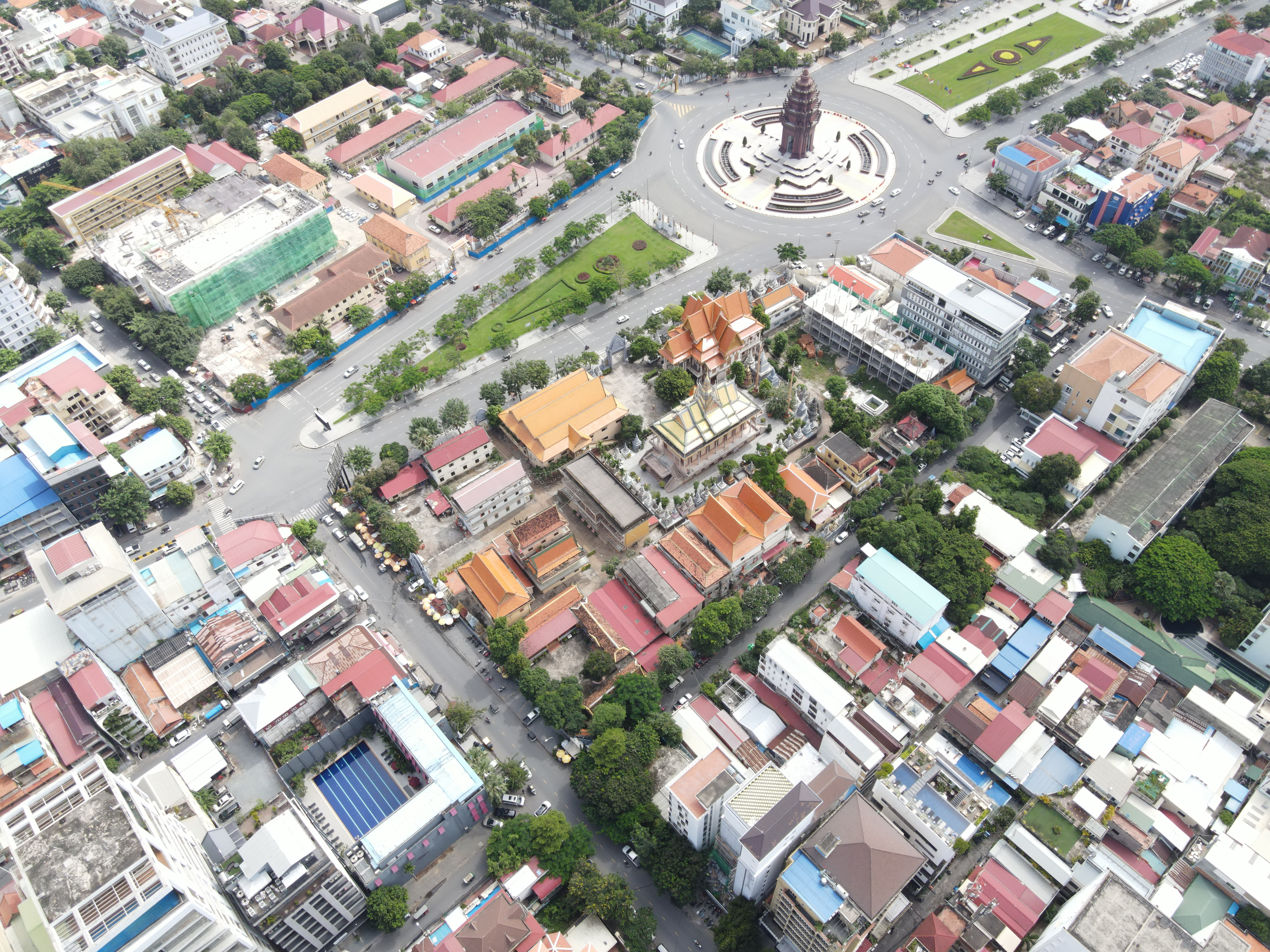
Aerial View of Wat Langka and Independence Monument
