= Prasat Kuh Nokor =

Buddhist temple in Kampong Thom Province, Cambodia

- ប្រាសាទគុហនគរ
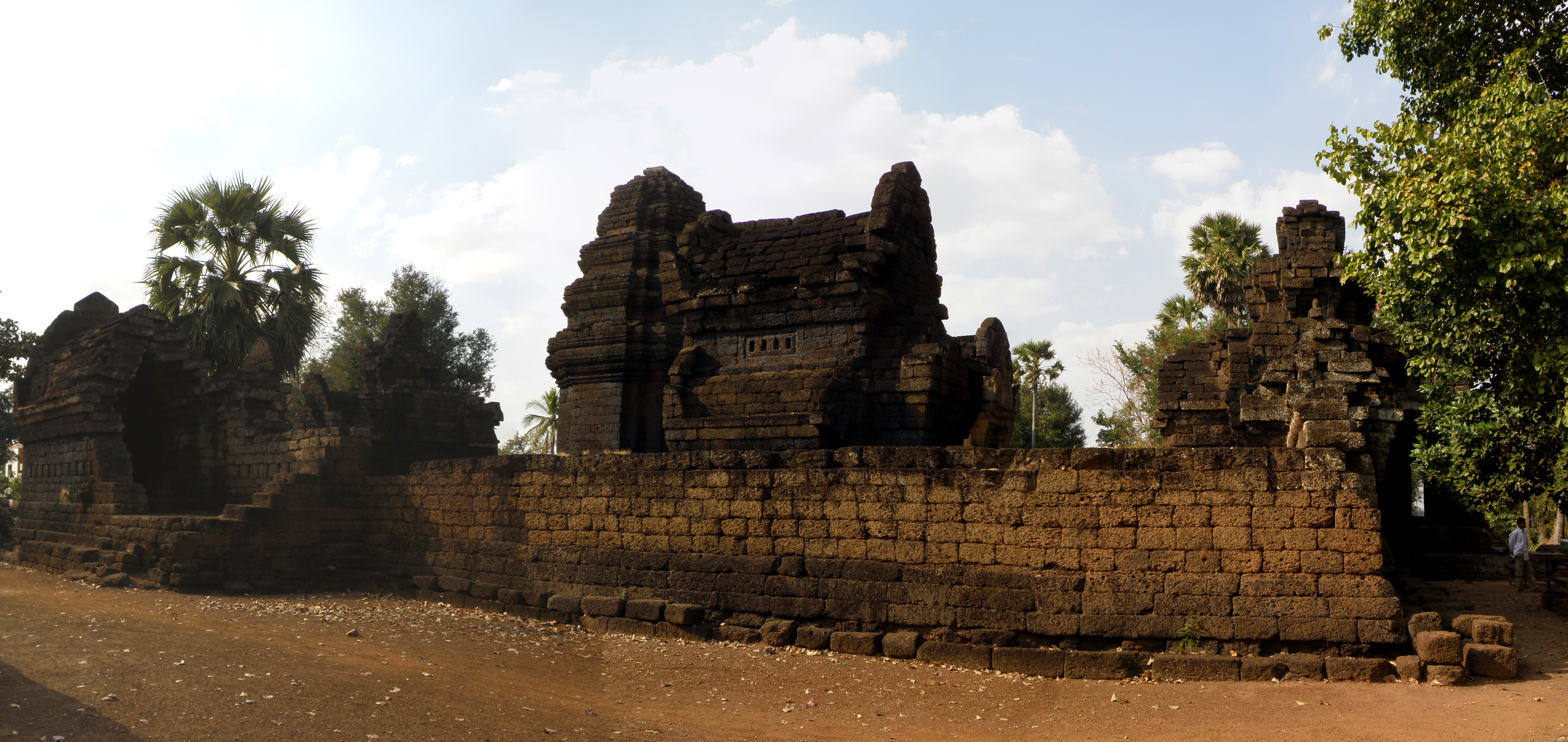

- Location within Cambodia

Religion
- Affiliation: Buddhism

Location
- Location: Baray District, in Kampong Thom Province
- Country: Cambodia
- Coordinates: 12.242439°N 102.3585401°E

Architecture
- Founder: Suryavarman I
- Completed: 10th -11th century

Prasat Kuh Nokor or KuhNoKor Temple is a Buddhist temple in the village of Trodoc Poung, Pong Ror commune, in Baray District, in Kampong Thom Province, Cambodia. It was built in 10th -11th century by the king Suryavarman I (1002-1050). It is part of the pagoda Wat Kuh Nokor.

It was built on a square shaped courtyard consisting of laterite and sandstone facing east. The throne is also square decorated by lotus flowers with several male statues. One of the statues is known to locals as the ‘Neak Ta Bark Kor’.

The temple is known also for its two ponds temple. The largest is 160 metres long and 88 metres wide. The smaller of the two is 45 metres in length and 20 metres wide.
