= Thommasaok Reachea =

Thommasaok Reachea (Khmer: ធម្មាសោករាជ, Dhammāsokarāja), also known as Kaeo Fa, was a king of the Khmer Empire between 1373 and 1393. The Khmer Chronicle of Ang Eng states that after arriving in Angkor Thom, his brother the current king of the Khmer Empire, Barom Reameathibtei was poisoned by his concubine and died. Kaeo Fa who succeeded him then took the title of Thommasaok Reachea, becoming the next king. The Document on Great Khmer Figures states that Kaeo Fa became king in 1373.
