= Wat Ounalom =

Buddhist temple in Phnom Penh, Cambodia

- វត្តឧណ្ណាលោម
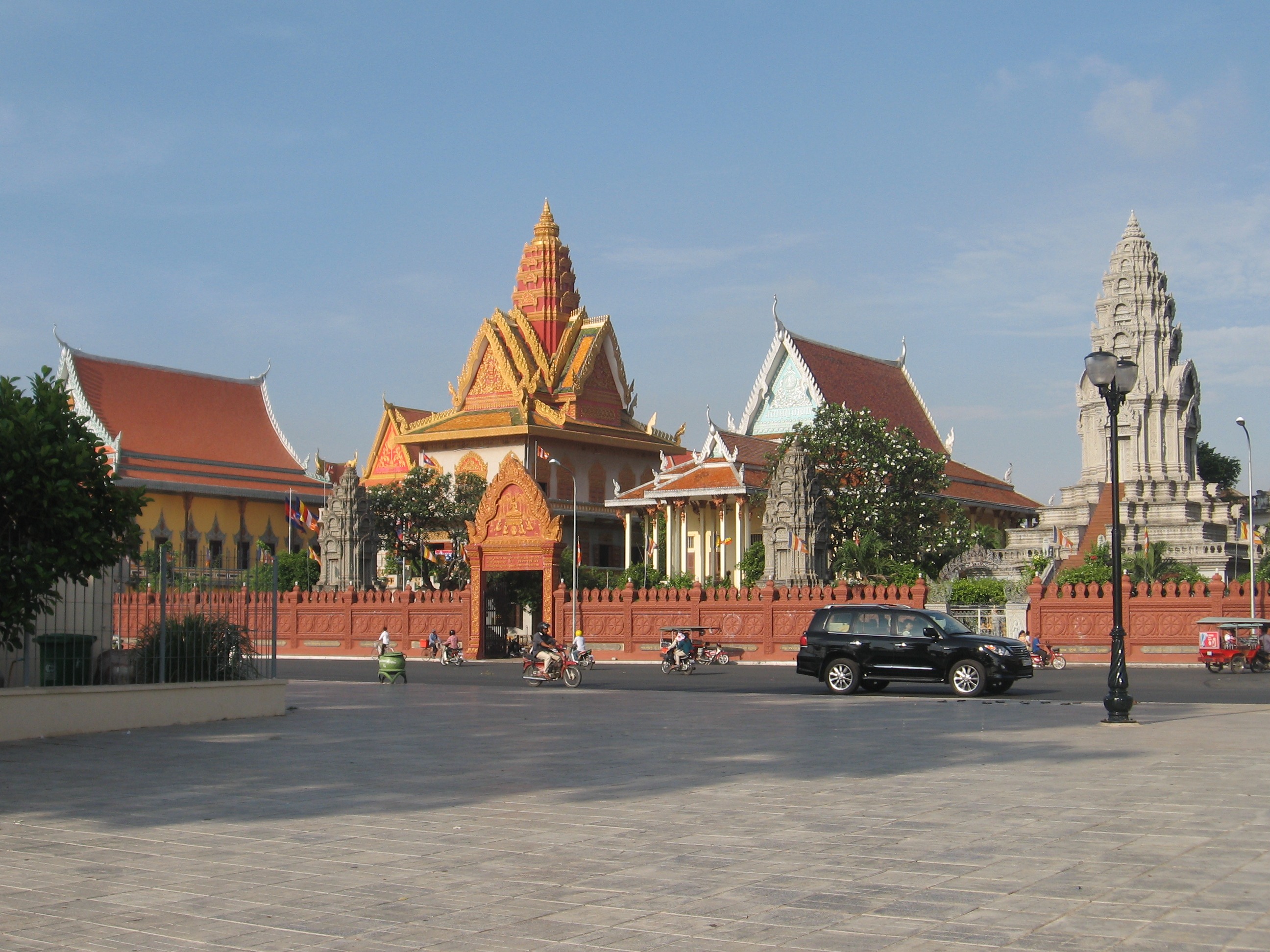
- Wat Ounalom from the east

- Location within Cambodia

Religion
- Affiliation: Theravada Buddhism
- District: Daun Penh
- Province: Phnom Penh

Location
- Country: Cambodia
- Coordinates: 11°34′05″N 104°55′47″E

Architecture
- Completed: 1443

Wat Ounalom (Khmer: វត្តឧណ្ណាលោម, UNGEGN: Vôtt Ŭnnaloŭm, ALA-LC: Vatt Uṇṇālom, IPA: [ʋɔət ʔunnaːloːm]; also Wat Unnalom and several other spellings) is a wat located on Sisowath Quay in Phnom Penh, Cambodia, near the Chaktomuk Royal Palace. As the former seat of Cambodia's Mahanikaya Order, it is regarded as the most important wat in Phnom Penh and the central institution of Cambodian Buddhism. It was established in 1443 and consists of 44 structures.

Originally, Wat Ounalom is believed to have been an ancient religious site, as it contains the large Ounalom Stupa, which was built over an older Angkorian-era stone sanctuary. Evidence suggests that it was constructed during the reign of King Barom Reachea (Chao Phraya Yat). The temple’s name, "Wat Ounalom", derives from the main stupa — the central one among five — located to the west of the temple. Wat Ounalom is said to be older than the city of Phnom Penh itself.

The main complex houses a stupa that contains what is believed to be an eyebrow hair of the Buddha and an inscription in Pali.

== Etymology ==
The name of Wat Ounalom commemorates one of the holiest relics in Cambodia, a hair (loŭm) from the whorl (ŭnna) between the eyebrows of the Buddha.

== History ==
The temple underwent restoration during the tenure of the Supreme Patriarch (Thieng). When Prince Damrong Rajanubhab of Siam visited Phnom Penh, he described the temple as follows:

"I visited Wat Ounalom, which is the temple of the Supreme Patriarch of the Mahanikaya Order, located north of the Royal Palace. Among the temples in Phnom Penh, whether royal or public, even those of ancient origin like Wat Ounalom, were often rebuilt during the reign of King Norodom, when Phnom Penh was established as the capital. Later, the old ordination hall (ubosot) was demolished and replaced by a new one. Construction of the new building began in 1957 and was completed in 1960. A merit-making ceremony celebrating its completion was held for four days and three nights from June 1–4, 1963. The new ordination hall is a three-story structure."

During the Khmer Rouge period, Wat Ounalom suffered severe destruction. However, it was rapidly restored afterward and has since become one of the most important religious and tourist sites in Phnom Penh today.

== Architecture ==
Wat Ounalom’s complex comprises 44 buildings, including monastic residences, shrines, and educational facilities. The central stupa dominates the grounds and enshrines the sacred relic traditionally identified as one of the Buddha’s eyebrow hairs. The three-story ordination hall, reconstructed in the late 1950s, serves as the main ceremonial building.

== Significance ==
As the traditional seat of the Mahanikaya Supreme Patriarch, Wat Ounalom functions as the spiritual and administrative center of Cambodian Theravāda Buddhism. It is one of the key pilgrimage destinations in the country and an important symbol of Buddhist continuity in Cambodia, particularly following its reconstruction after the devastation of the Khmer Rouge era.

== Gallery ==
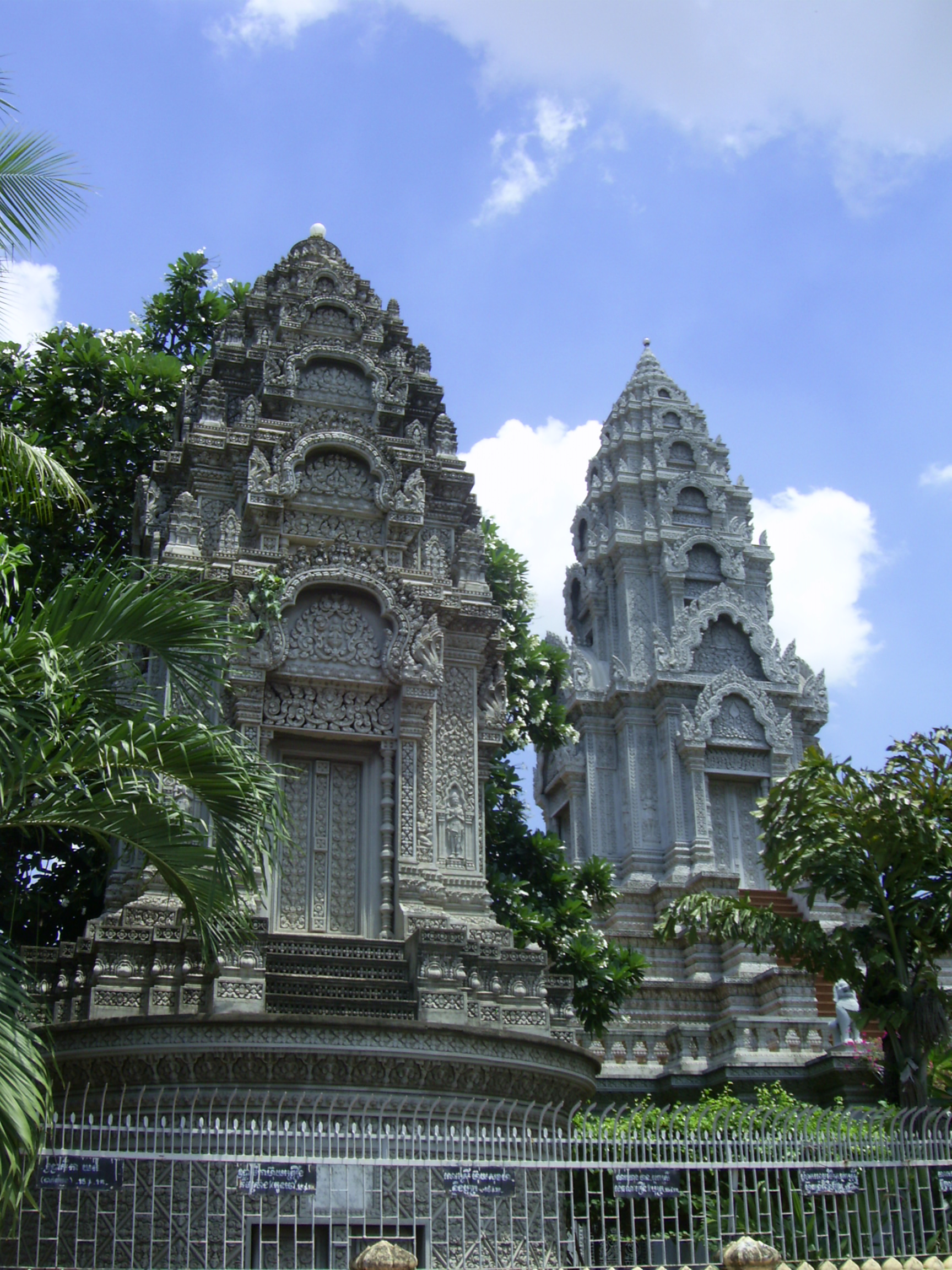

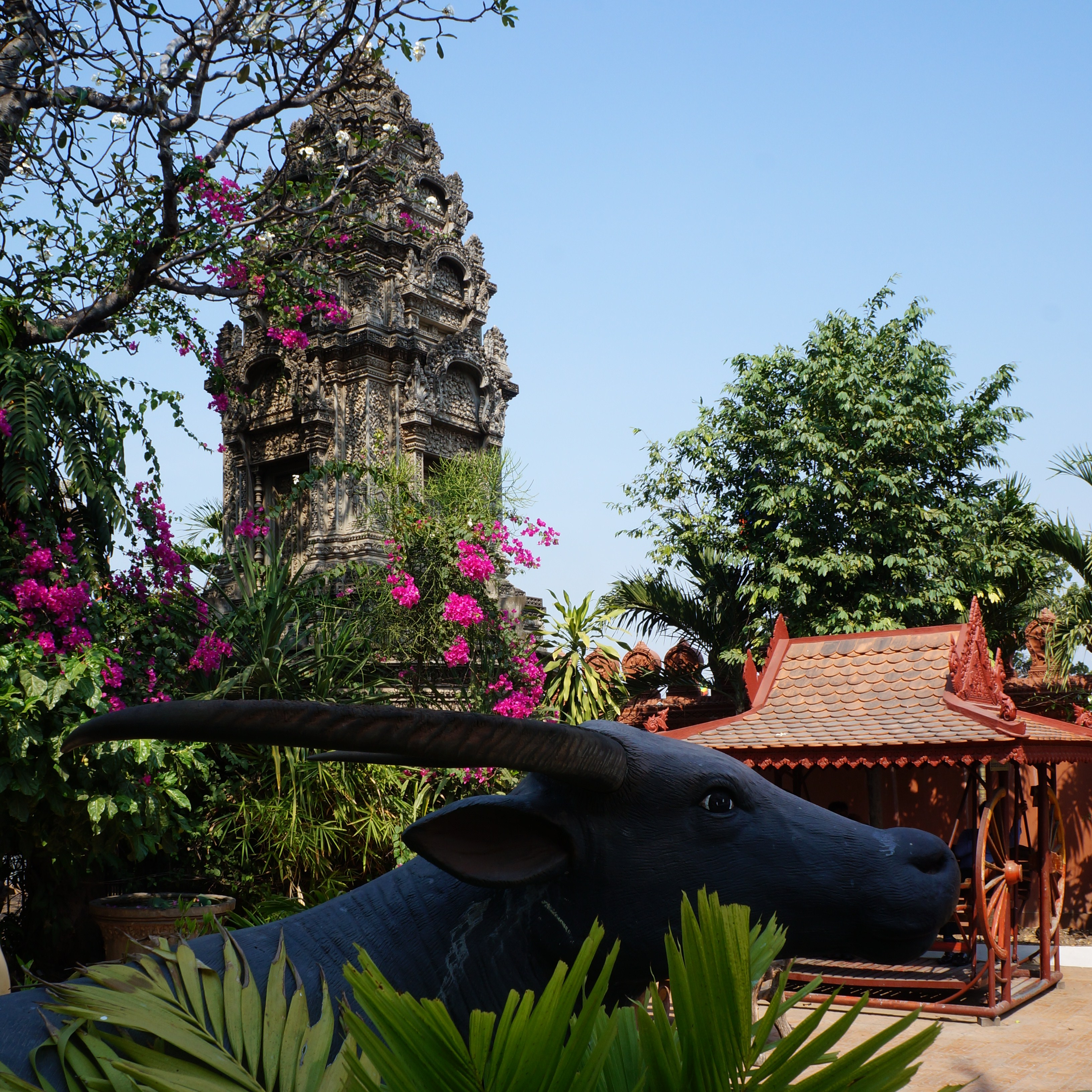

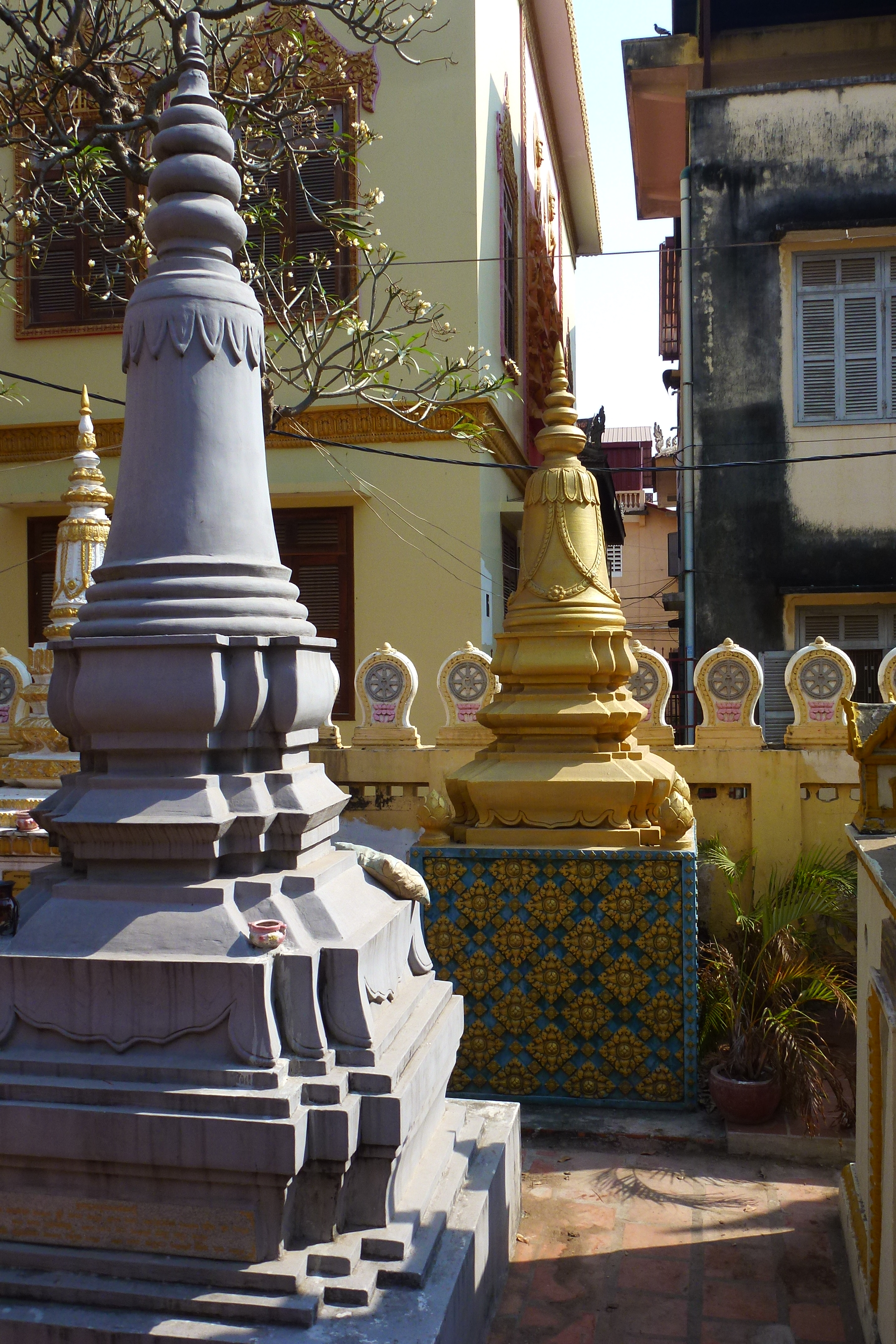

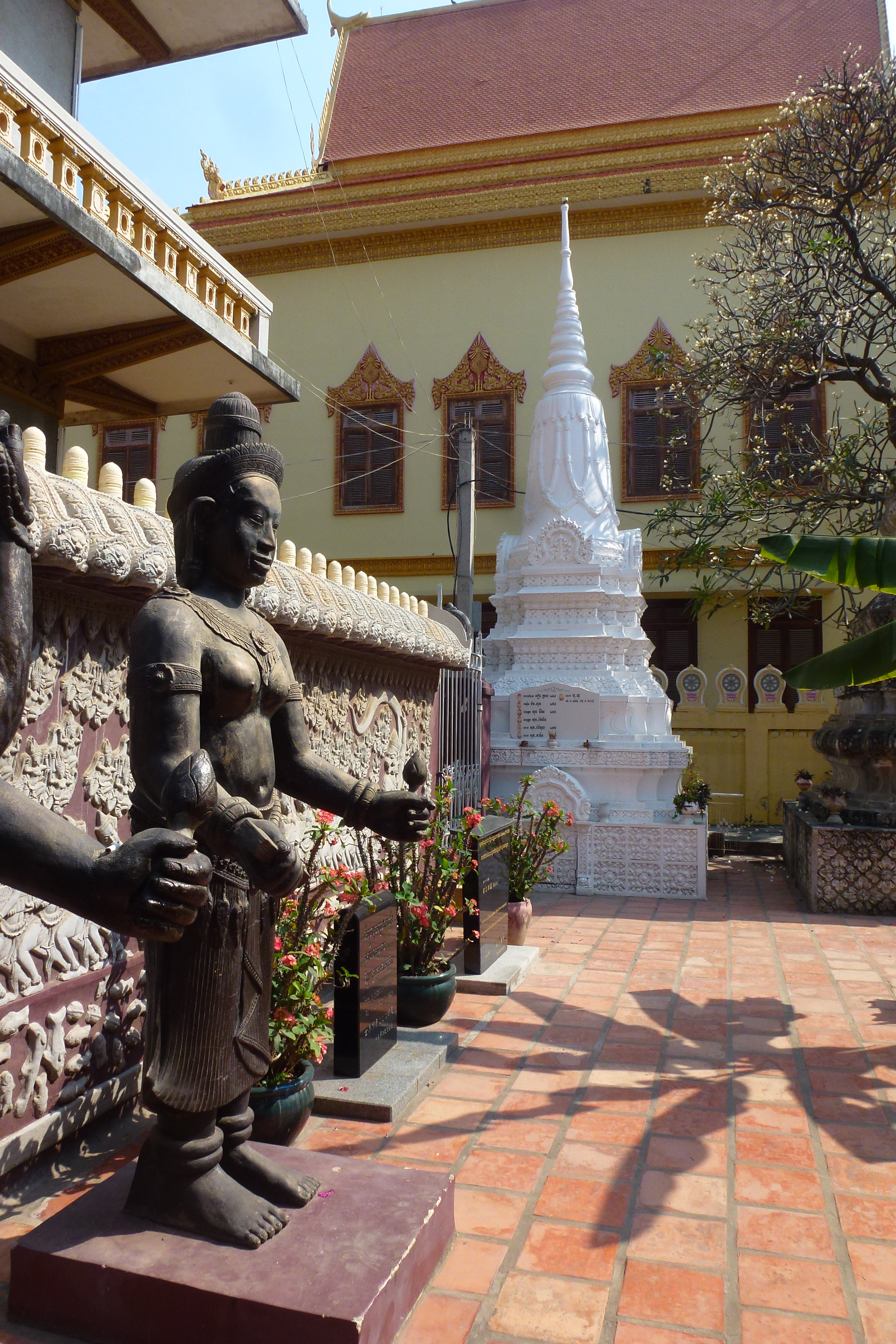

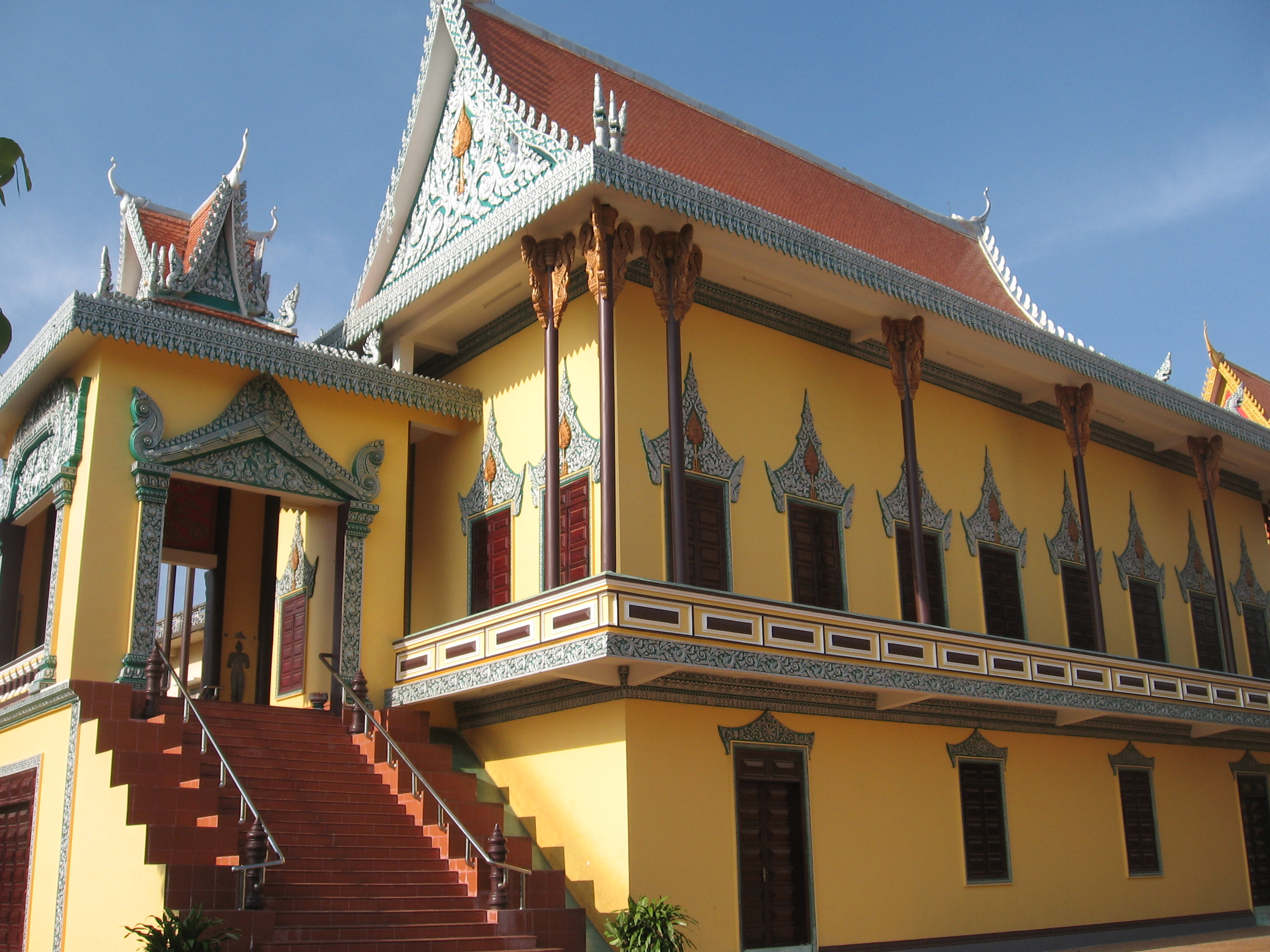

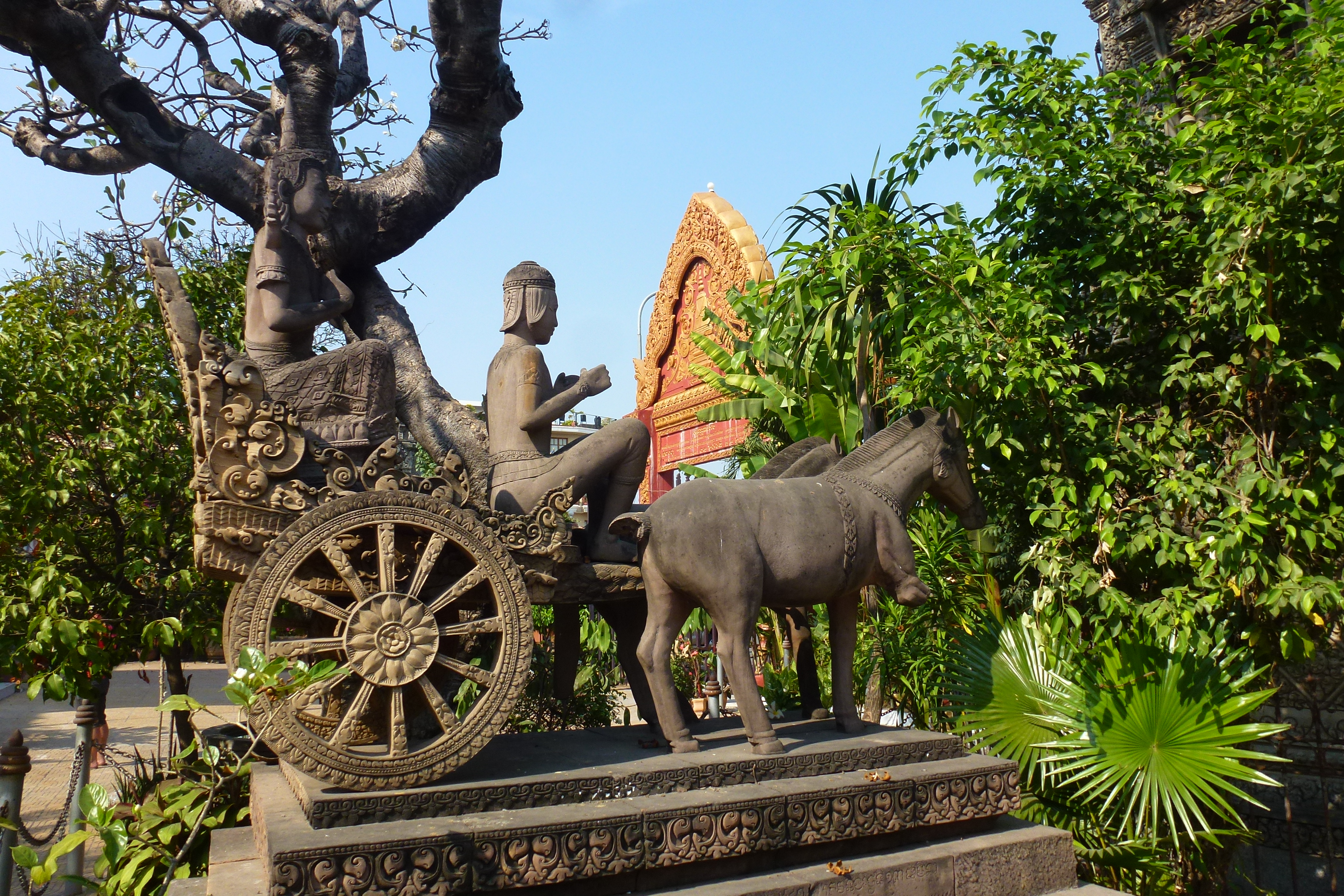

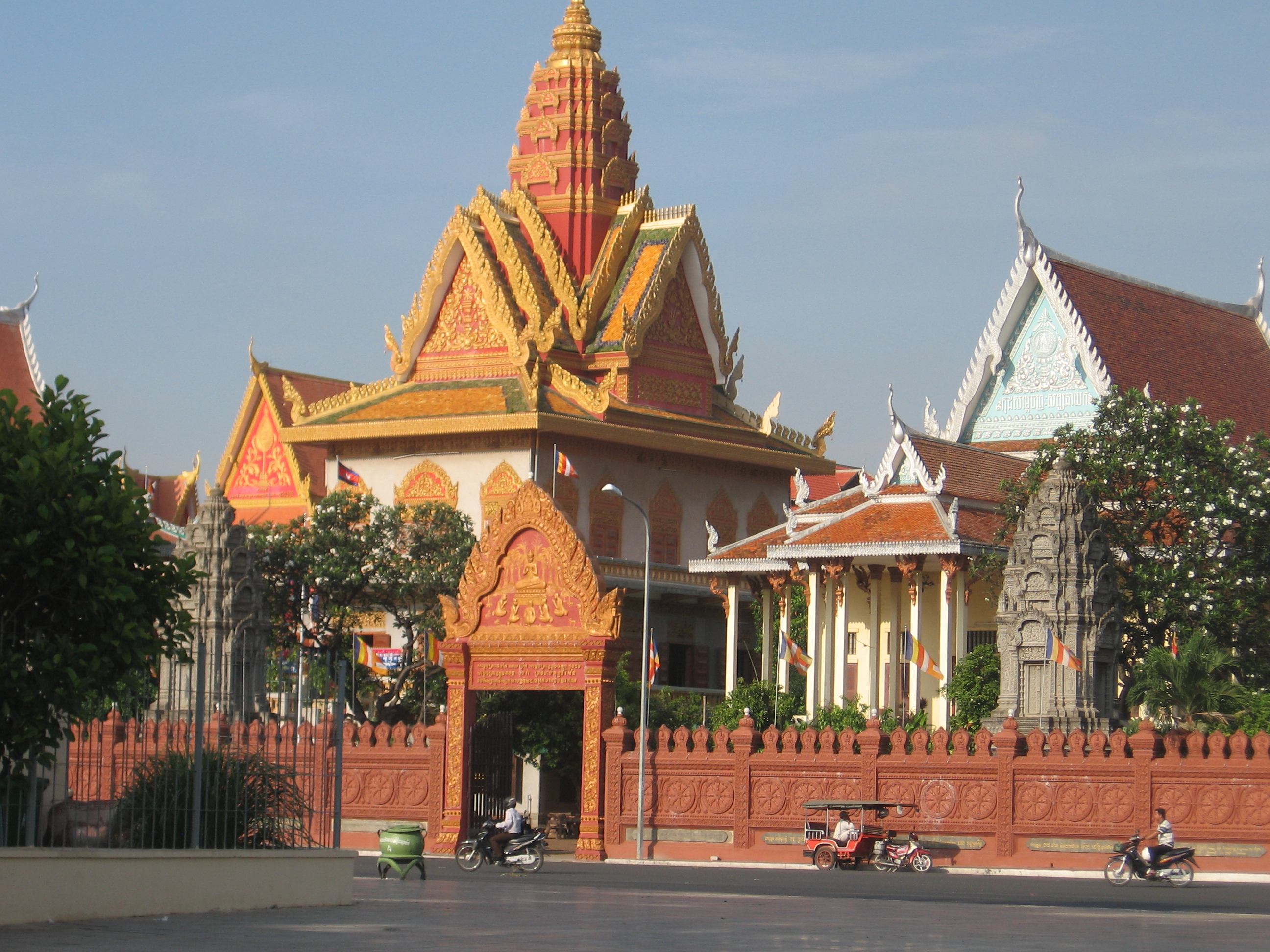

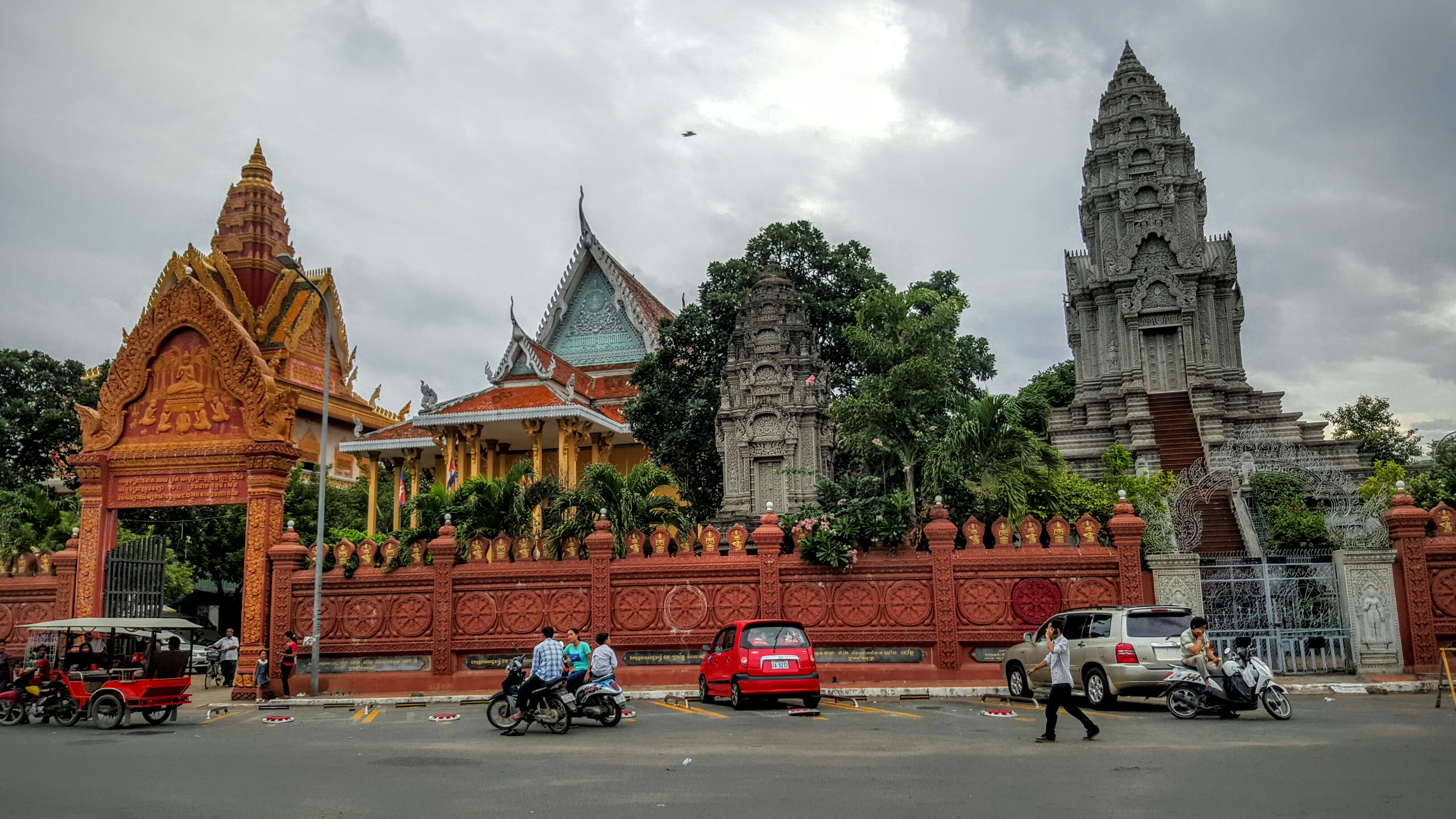

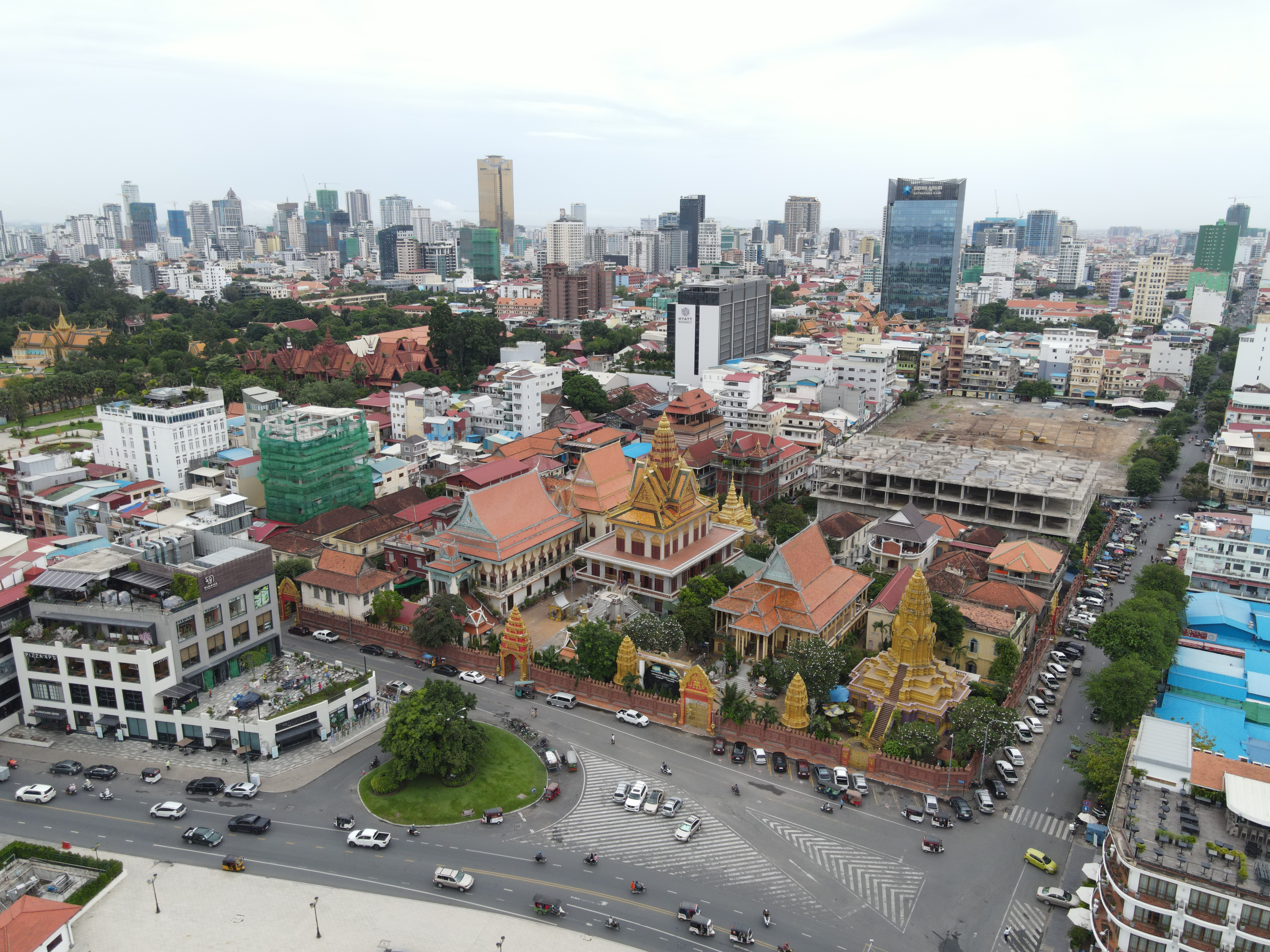
Monks of the Mahānikay sect assembled for the annual synod, 1960
