= List of wars involving Vietnam =

This is a list of wars involving the Socialist Republic of Vietnam and its predecessor states.

Color legend:

- Red: Involved with China
- Yellow: Involved with Champa
- Brown: Civil war
- White: Internal conflict, throne crisis

== Ancient era ==
=== Hồng Bàng dynasty (2879–258 BC) ===
Conflict	Van Lang	Opponents	Result
Âu Việt-Lạc Việt War (258–257 BC) (Note: 258 BC is the current consensus. Some Vietnamese sources such as the Đại Việt sử lược and the Đại Việt sử ký toàn thư contend that this event took place in 208 BC; whereas the Chinese Records of the Grand Historian dates the enthronement of Thục Phán in 218 BC, amidst the Qin campaign against the Baiyue.)	Văn Lang under Hung Kings (Lạc Việt)	Âu Việt led by Thục Phán	Victory for Âu Việt: Thục Phán (An Dương Vương) conquered Lạc Việt.; Merging of Âu Việt and Lạc Việt into Âu Lạc.

=== Thục dynasty (258–207 BC or 208–179 BC) ===
Conflict	Thuc dynasty	Opponents	Result
Qin campaign against the Baiyue (221–214 BC)	Baiyue	Qin dynasty	Qin victory: Qin annexation of Minyue, Nanyue and Dong'ou
Âu Lạc-Nanyue War (207 BC or 179 BC)	Âu Lạc under Thuc dynasty (An Duong Vuong)	Nanyue led by Zhao Tuo (Triệu Đà)	Defeat: Nanyue annexed Âu Lạc.

=== Triệu dynasty (207 BC or 179–111 BC) ===
Conflict	Trieu (Zhao) dynasty	Opponents	Result
Han conquest of Nanyue (111 BC)	Nanyue	Han dynasty	Han victory: Nanyue annexed by the Han; Beginning of the First Era of Northern Domination in Vietnam

== First, Second and Third Chinese domination era ==
=== First Chinese domination (111 BC – 40 AD) ===
Conflict	Jiaozhi	Opponents	Result
Tây Vu Vương rebellion (111 BC)	Tây Vu Vương's forces in Jiaozhi and Jiuzhen Commanderies	Han dynasty (Western Han) under Emperor Wu	Defeat: Tay Vu Vuong killed.
Trưng Sisters' Uprising (40 AD)	Trưng sisters' forces in Jiaozhi Commandery	Han dynasty (Eastern Han) under Emperor Guangwu	Victory: Trưng Trắc proclaimed as Queen of Lingnan.; End of the First Chinese domination of Vietnam.

=== Trưng Queen (40–43) ===
Conflict	Trung Queen	Opponents	Result
Han invasion of Lingnan (42–43)	Lingnan under Trưng Queen	Han dynasty (Eastern Han)	Defeat: Death of the Trưng sisters.; Eastern Han annexed Lingnan.; Beginning of the Second Chinese domination of Vietnam.

=== Second Chinese domination (43–541) ===
Conflict	Jiaozhi/Jiaozhou	Opponents	Result
Chu Đạt's rebellion (157–160)	Chu Đạt's forces in Jiuzhen	Han dynasty (Eastern Han)	Defeat
Liang Long's rebellion (178–181)	Liang Long's forces in Hepu, Jiuzhen, Jiaozhi and Rinan	Han dynasty (Eastern Han)	Defeat
Sri Mara's rebellion (192)	Sri Mara's forces (Khu Liên) in Xianglin	Han dynasty (Eastern Han)	Victory: Founding of Lâm Ấp (Linyi) kingdom, predecessor to later Champa kingdoms.
Lady Triệu's rebellion (248)	Lady Triệu's forces in Jiaozhou	Eastern Wu	Defeat
Jiao Province Campaign (263–271)	Eastern Wu	Cao Wei (until 266); Western Jin (from 266)	Eastern Wu victory: Eastern Wu reclaims Jiao Province
Jin–Lâm Ấp conflict (351–359)	Jiaozhou under Jin dynasty	Lâm Ấp (Linyi)	Jin victory
Jin–Lâm Ấp conflict (399)	Jiaozhou under Jin dynasty	Lâm Ấp (Linyi)	Jin victory
Jin–Lâm Ấp conflict (413–415)	Jiaozhou under Jin dynasty	Lâm Ấp (Linyi)	Jin victory
Liu Song-Lâm Ấp War (445–446)	Jiaozhou under Liu Song dynasty	Lâm Ấp (Linyi)	Liu Song victory: Sack of Kandarapura, capital city of Lâm Ấp, by the Liu Song.
Lý Trường Nhân's rebellion (468)	Lý Trường Nhân's forces in Jiaozhou	Liu Song	Victory: Liu Song agrees to appoint Lý Trường Nhân as governor of Jiaozhou.
Lý Bí's rebellion (541–544)	Lý Bí's forces in Jiaozhou	Liang dynasty	Victory: Lý Bí proclaimed as the Emperor of Vạn Xuân.; Foundation of Vạn Xuân kingdom under Early Lý dynasty.; End of the Second Chinese domination of Vietnam.

=== Early Lý dynasty (544–602) ===
Conflict	Early Ly dynasty	Opponents	Result
Vạn Xuân-Lâm Ấp War (543)	Vạn Xuân under Early Lý dynasty	Lâm Ấp	Victory
Liang–Vạn Xuân War (545–550)	Vạn Xuân under Early Lý dynasty	Liang dynasty	Victory: Liang forces withdraw from Vạn Xuân to quell Hou Jing's rebellion in Liang China
Vạn Xuân–Dã Năng War (557–571)	Vạn Xuân led by Triệu Quang Phục	Dã Năng (vi) led by Lý Phật Tử	Territorial and throne changes: Lý Phật Tử proclaimed Emperor of Vạn Xuân; Merger of Vạn Xuân and Dã Năng
Sui–Vạn Xuân War (602)	Former Lý dynasty	Sui dynasty	Decisive Sui victory: Surrender of Lý Phật Tử to Sui dynasty; Chinese rule in Vietnam re-established

=== Third Chinese domination (602–905) ===
Conflict	Event	Annan/Jinghai	Opponents	Result
Sui–Lâm Ấp War (605)		Jiaozhi under Sui dynasty	Lâm Ấp	Sui victory
Lý Tự Tiên's rebellion (687)		Lý Tự Tiên's and Đinh Kiến's forces in Annan	Tang dynasty	Defeat
Mai Thúc Loan's rebellion (722–723)		Mai Thúc Loan's forces in Annan	Tang dynasty	Defeat
Phùng Hưng's rebellion (766–791)		Phùng Hưng's forces in Annan	Tang dynasty	Defeat
Javanese raid in Tang's Annan (767)		Annan under Tang dynasty	Javanese raiders from Shailendra dynasty	Tang victory
Javanese raids in Hoàn Vương (774–787)	First raid (774)	Hoàn Vương (Huanwang Champa)	Javanese raiders from Shailendra dynasty	Hoàn Vương victory
Javanese raids in Hoàn Vương (774–787)	Second raid (787)	Hoàn Vương (Huanwang Champa)	Javanese raiders from Shailendra dynasty	Hoàn Vương victory
Hoàn Vương–Tang conflicts (803–809)	First war (803)	Annan under Tang dynasty	Hoàn Vương (Huanwang Champa)	Tang victory
Hoàn Vương–Tang conflicts (803–809)	Second war (809)	Annan under Tang dynasty	Hoàn Vương (Huanwang Champa)	Tang victory
Dương Thanh's rebellion (819–820)		Dương Thanh's forces in Annan	Tang dynasty	Defeat
Tang–Nanzhao wars (846–866)	First raid (846)	Annan under Tang dynasty	Nanzhao; Local rebels in Annan	Tang victory
Tang–Nanzhao wars (846–866)	Second raid (860–861)	Annan under Tang dynasty	Nanzhao; Local rebels in Annan	Tang victory
Tang–Nanzhao wars (846–866)	Siege of Songping (863)	Annan under Tang dynasty	Nanzhao; Local rebels in Annan	Nanzhao victory: Nanzhao's forces capture Songping, the capital of Annan
Tang–Nanzhao wars (846–866)	Tang's offensive (865–866)	Annan under Tang dynasty	Nanzhao; Local rebels in Annan	Tang Victory: Tang forces recapture Songping and Annan
Khúc Thừa Dụ's rebellion (905)		Khúc Thừa Dụ's forces in Jianghai Circuit	Tang dynasty	Victory: Tang agree to appoint Khúc Thừa Dụ as jiedushi of Jinghai Circuit; Khúc clan establishes an autonomous government of the Vietnamese people; End of the Third Chinese domination of Vietnam

== Independent monarchical era ==
=== Autonomous period under Khúc clan and Dương clan (905–938) ===
Conflict	Khuc clan/Duong clan	Opponents	Result
First Jinghai–Southern Han War (930)	Jinghai Circuit under Khúc clan	Southern Han dynasty	Defeat: Southern Han captures Khúc Thừa Mỹ; Jinghai Circuit falls under Southern Han control
Dương Đình Nghệ's rebellion (931)	Dương Đình Nghệ's forces in Jinghai Circuit	Southern Han dynasty	Victory: Dương Đình Nghệ self-established as jiedushi
Second Jinghai-Southern Han War (938)	Ngô Quyền's forces in Jinghai Circuit	Southern Han dynasty	Victory: Ngô Quyền crowned as the King of Jinghai; Ngô dynasty established; Beginning of the Independent era

=== Ngô dynasty (939–965) ===
Conflict	Ngo dynasty	Opponents	Result
Dương Tam Kha's mutiny (944–950)	Ngô Xương Ngập's forces Ngô Xương Văn's forces	Dương Tam Kha's forces	Ngo king victory: Dương Tam Kha suppressed; Both Ngô Xương Văn và Ngô Xương Ngập becomeking; Ngô dynasty weakened
The rebellion of Đường and Nguyễn villages (965) (vi)	Ngô Xương Văn's forces in Jinghai Circuit	The rebels in Đường and Nguyễn villages	Defeat: Ngô Xương Văn is killed in action; Beginning of the 12 War Lords Anarchy
Anarchy of the 12 Warlords (965–968)	12 warlords, including Đinh Bộ Lĩnh's forces		Victory for Đinh Bộ Lĩnh (Đinh Tiên Hoàng): Unification into Đại Cồ Việt; Đinh Bộ Lĩnh crowned as the Emperor of Đại Cồ Việt; Đinh dynasty established

=== Đinh dynasty (968–980) ===
Conflict	Dinh dynasty	Opponents	Result
Countercoup against Lê Hoàn (979)	Loyal forces of Đinh Điền (vi), Nguyễn Bặc, Phạm Hạp and Ngô Nhật Khánh	Lê Hoàn's forces Supported by: Queen dowager Dương Vân Nga	Dynasty change: Lê Hoàn (Lê Đại Hành) crowned as the Emperor; Early Lê dynasty established

=== Early Lê dynasty (980–1009) ===
Conflict	Early Le dynasty	Opponents	Result
Song–Đại Cồ Việt war (981)	Đại Cồ Việt under Lê Đại Hành	Song dynasty under Emperor Taizong	Victory: Song forced to diplomatically recognize the sovereignty of Đại Cồ Việt
First Champa–Đại Cồ Việt War (982)	Đại Cồ Việt under Lê Đại Hành	Champa under Paramesvaravarman I	Victory
Dương Tiến Lộc's rebellion (989)	Đại Cồ Việt under Lê Đại Hành	The rebels of Dương Tiến Lộc in Hoan and Ái provinces	Victory: Rebellion quelled
Song–Đại Cồ Việt border conflict (995) (vi)	Đại Cồ Việt under Lê Đại Hành	Song army in Qinzhou and Namzningz	Victory: Đại Cồ Việt navy raids Như Hồng province of Qinzhou; Đại Cồ Việt infantry attacks Namzningz, but are defeated; Đại Cồ Việt agrees to make peace with the Song dynasty
Conquered four tribes in Ma Hoàng (996)	Đại Cồ Việt under Lê Đại Hành	The army of tribe Đại, Phát, Đan, Ba in Ma Hoàng	Victory: The land of the four tribes - Đại, Phát, Đan, and Ba - in Ma Hoàng belong to the Early Lê dynasty
Conquered tribes in Hà Động (999)	Đại Cồ Việt under Lê Đại Hành	The army of 49 tribes in Hà Động	Victory: The Nhật Tắc tribe and other tribes in Định Biên province are defeated; All tribes capitulated to the emperor
Cử Long barbarian's rebellion (1001)	Đại Cồ Việt under Lê Đại Hành	The rebels in Cử Long province	Victory: Rebellion quelled; Đinh Toàn is killed in action
First Throne Crisis of Early Lê dynasty (1005)	Lê Long Việt's forces	Lê Long Tích's forces (vi)	Victory for Lê Long Việt: Lê Long Việt (Lê Trung Tông) crowned as Emperor
Second Throne Crisis of Early Lê dynasty (1005)	Lê Long Việt's royal court	Rebellion forces of Lê Long Cân (vi), Lê Long Kính (vi) and Lê Long Đinh (vi)	Lê Long Việt victory

=== Later Lý dynasty (1009–1225) ===
Conflict	Later Ly dynasty	Opponents	Result
Conquer the Cử Long barbarian in Ái Châu (1011)	Đại Cồ Việt under Lý Thái Tổ	The Cử Long army in Ái Châu	Victory: The Cử Long barbarian in Ái Châu was suppressed
Dali–Đại Cồ Việt War (1014)	Đại Cồ Việt under Lý Thái Tổ	Dali Kingdom	Victory: Tens of thousands of Dali's troops were killed in action; Countless Dali troops and horses were captured
Lý Phật Mã pacified Diễn Châu's secession (1026)	Đại Cồ Việt under Lý Thái Tổ	Diễn Châu's secessionist troop	Victory: Diễn Châu's secessionist troop is defeated
Throne crisis of Later Lý dynasty (1028)	Crown Prince Lý Phật Mã's forces	Rebellion forces of Đông Chinh Vương, Vũ Đức Vương and Dực Thánh Vương	Lý Phật Mã victory: Lý Phật Mã (Lý Thái Tông) retains the throne
Nong Quanfu's rebellion (1038–1041)	Đại Cồ Việt under Lý Thái Tông	Nong Quanfu's Changqi Kingdom	Victory: Nong Quanfu is killed
First Nong Zhigao rebellions (1041)	Đại Cồ Việt under Lý Thái Tông	Nong Zhigao's Dali Kingdom	Victory: Nong Zhigao is defeated, but spared by the emperor and granted authority to govern the tribes and mountainous provinces.
Champa–Đại Cồ Việt War (1044)	Đại Cồ Việt under Lý Thái Tông	Champa	Victory
Second Nong Zhigao rebellions (1048)	Đại Cồ Việt under Lý Thái Tông	Nong Zhigao's Nantian Kingdom	Victory: Nong Zhigao defeated and surrenders
Third Nong Zhigao rebellions (1052 - 1055)	Đại Cồ Việt under Lý Thái Tông	Nong Zhigao's army	Territorial change: Nong Zhigao seceded, self-declared as king and sought annexation by Song but was rejected; Nong Zhigao raided Song's territories; Đại Cồ Việt requested an alliance with the Song to defeat Zhigao but was rejected
Third Nong Zhigao rebellions (1052 - 1055)	Nong Zhigao's army (seek aid from the Ly dynasty since October 1053)	Song dynasty under Emperor Renzong	Victory: Nong Zhigao is defeated by the Song and killed by Dali before Đại Việt's troops could come to his aid.; The Song wiped out Nong Zhigao's remaining forces.
Champa–Đại Việt war (1069)	Đại Việt under Lý Thánh Tông	Champa under Rudravarman III	Victory: Đại Việt annexes Ma Linh, Bố Chính, Địa Lý (present-day Quảng Bình and Quảng Trị)
Champa–Đại Việt border crisis (1074)	Đại Việt under Lý Nhân Tông	Champa under Harivarman IV	Defeat: Champa raid the border of Dai Viet.
Champa–Đại Việt war (1075)	Đại Việt under Lý Nhân Tông	Champa under Harivarman IV	Defeat: Nation army led by Lý Thường Kiệt fails to defeat Champa's army
Đại Việt–Song war (1075–1077): Conquer the Song’s Qinzhou, Lianzhou, and Yongzhou (1075–1076) (vi)	Đại Việt under Lý Nhân Tông	Song dynasty under Emperor Shenzong	Victory: Đại Việt's troops capture several of Song's forts and later retreat
Đại Việt–Song war (1075–1077): Song's counterattack (1077)	Đại Việt under Lý Nhân Tông	Song dynasty under Emperor Shenzong	Indecisive: Song's forces repelled; Status quo ante bellum and peace agreement between Later Lý dynasty and Song dynasty
Lý Giác's rebellion (1103)	Đại Việt under Lý Nhân Tông	Rebellion forces of Lý Giác in Diễn Châu	Victory: Nation army led by Lý Thường Kiệt defeat the rebellion; Lý Giác flees to Champa; Provokes war with Champa in 1103 - 1104
Đại Việt–Khmer Wars: First Khmer's campaign (1128)	Đại Việt under Lý Thần Tông	Khmer Empire	Victory
Đại Việt–Khmer Wars: Khmer–Champa's joint campaign (1132)	Đại Việt under Lý Thần Tông	Khmer Empire; Champa	Victory: Khmer's forces repelled; Champa briefly regains control of Ma Linh, Bố Chính, Địa Lý, but are later expelled
Đại Việt–Khmer Wars: Second Khmer's campaign (1137)	Đại Việt under Lý Thần Tông	Khmer Empire	Victory
Quách Bốc's rebellion (1209)	Đại Việt under Lý Cao Tông	Quách Bốc's forces	Victory: Decline of Later Lý dynasty
Nguyễn Nộn's rebellion (1213–1219)	Đại Việt under Lý Huệ Tông	Nguyễn Nộn's forces (vi)	Victory: Decline of Later Lý dynasty

=== Trần dynasty (1226–1400) ===
Conflict	Event	Tran dynasty	Opponents	Results
Second Champa–Đại Việt War (1252)		Đại Việt under Trần dynasty	Champa	Victory
First Đại Việt–Mongol War (1257–1258)		Đại Việt under Trần dynasty	Mongol Empire	Victory: Mongol troops briefly occupy the Thăng Long capital, are later expelled from Đại Việt; Emperor Trần Thái Tông agrees to become a tributary state to the Mongols
First Đại Việt–Yuan War (1285) or Second Đại Việt–Mongol War	Yuan's advance (January – May)	Đại Việt under Trần dynasty Champa	Yuan dynasty	Defeat: Trần leadership implements a scorched earth policy on the Thăng Long capital and retreat; Yuan troops occupy Thăng Long but fail to turn it into any strategic gain
First Đại Việt–Yuan War (1285) or Second Đại Việt–Mongol War	Đại Việt's counteroffensive (May – June)	Đại Việt under Trần dynasty Champa	Yuan dynasty	Victory: Yuan invasion repelled
First Đại Việt–Yuan War (1285) or Second Đại Việt–Mongol War	Battle of Chương Dương – 1285	Đại Việt under Trần dynasty Champa	Yuan dynasty	Victory
Second Đại Việt–Yuan War (1287–1288) or Third Đại Việt–Mongol War	Yuan's advance (1287 – January 1288)	Đại Việt under Trần dynasty	Yuan dynasty	Defeat: Yuan troops occupy the Thăng Long capital
Second Đại Việt–Yuan War (1287–1288) or Third Đại Việt–Mongol War	Battle of Bạch Đằng River (1288)	Đại Việt under Trần dynasty	Yuan dynasty	Victory: Yuan invasion repelled
Đại Việt–Muang Sua Wars (1294–1301)	First war (1294)	Đại Việt under Trần dynasty	Muang Sua	Victory: Đại Việt annexes present-day eastern Xiangkhouang
Đại Việt–Muang Sua Wars (1294–1301)	Second war (1297)	Đại Việt under Trần dynasty	Muang Sua	Victory: Đại Việt annexes present-day eastern Xiangkhouang
Đại Việt–Muang Sua Wars (1294–1301)	Third war (1301)	Đại Việt under Trần dynasty	Muang Sua	Victory: Đại Việt annexes present-day eastern Xiangkhouang
Third Champa–Đại Việt War (1311)		Đại Việt under Trần dynasty	Champa	Victory: King Chế Chí (Jaya Simhavarman IV) captured by Đại Việt; Đại Việt installed Chế Năng as King of Champa
Fourth Champa–Đại Việt War (1318)		Đại Việt under Trần dynasty	Champa	Victory: Chế Năng escapes to Majapahit
Fifth Champa–Đại Việt War (1367–1368)		Đại Việt under Trần dynasty	Champa	Defeat: Beginning of a series of Champa counter-offensives
Coup against Dương Nhật Lễ (1369–1370)		Dương Nhật Lễ's royal court	Trần Phủ's forces	Throne change: Trần Phủ (Trần Nghệ Tông) crowned as the Emperor; Dương Nhật Lễ's Queen mother flees to Champa and asks Chế Bồng Nga (Po Binasour) to avenge her
Sixth Champa–Đại Việt War (1371)		Đại Việt under Trần dynasty	Champa	Defeat: Champa forces set the city on fire, seize women, jewels, and silks
Seventh Champa–Đại Việt War (1377)		Đại Việt under Trần dynasty	Champa	Defeat: Trần Duệ Tông is ambushed and killed in action in the battle of Vijaya
Eighth Champa–Đại Việt War (1378)		Đại Việt under Trần dynasty	Champa	Defeat: Champa forces loot the Thăng Long capital
Ninth Champa–Đại Việt War (1382)		Đại Việt under Trần dynasty	Champa	Victory: Champa attacks repelled
Tenth Champa-Đại Việt War (1390)		Đại Việt under Trần dynasty	Champa	Victory: Chế Bồng Nga (Po Binasour) killed in action; Status quo ante bellum; Decline of Trần dynasty

=== Hồ dynasty (1400–1407) ===
Conflict	Ho dynasty	Opponents	Result
Champa–Đại Ngu war (1400)	Đại Ngu under Hồ Quý Ly	Champa under Indravarman VI	Defeat
Champa–Đại Ngu war (1402)	Đại Ngu under Hồ Hán Thương	Champa under Indravarman VI	Victory: Đại Ngu annexed Chiêm Động and Cổ Lũy (present-day Quảng Nam and Quảng Ngãi)
Champa–Đại Ngu war (1403)	Đại Ngu under Hồ Hán Thương	Champa under Indravarman VI	Defeat: Đại Ngu failed to capture Vijaya capital
Champa–Đại Ngu war (1407)	Đại Ngu under Hồ Hán Thương	Champa under Indravarman VI; Ming dynasty under Emperor Yongle	Defeat: Champa recaptured Chiêm Động and Cổ Lũy
Đại Ngu–Ming War (1406–1407)	Đại Ngu under Hồ Hán Thương	Ming dynasty under Emperor Yongle	Defeat: Emperor Hồ Hán Thương captured and killed by Ming forces; Beginning of the Fourth Chinese domination of Vietnam

== Fourth Chinese Domination era ==
Conflict	Jiaozhi	Opponents	Result
Later Trần rebellion (1407–1414)	Later Trần rebels in Jiaozhi	Ming dynasty	Defeat: Rebel suppressed
Lam Sơn uprising (1418–1427)	Lam Sơn's rebels in Jiaozhi	Ming dynasty	Victory: Ming troops withdrew orderly with "the solemn oath of eternal friendship", under Lê Lợi (Lê Thái Tổ)'s supervision; Đại Việt regained its independence; Lê Lợi crowned as the Emperor of Đại Việt; Establishment of Later Lê dynasty

== Revived monarchical era ==
=== Later Lê dynasty – Initial period (1428–1527) ===
Conflict	Later Le dynasty	Opponents	Results
Ngưu Hống rebellion (1431–1432)	Đại Việt under Later Lê dynasty	Ngưu Hống led by Đèo Cát Hãn	Victory
Eleventh Champa–Đại Việt War (1446)	Đại Việt under Later Lê dynasty	Champa	Victory: Đại Việt captured Maha Vijaya
First throne crisis of Later Lê dynasty (1459)	Lê Nghi Dân's coup d'état forces	Lê Nhân Tông's royal court	Throne change: Lê Nhân Tông killed; Lê Nghi Dân declared himself as the Emperor
Second throne crisis of Later Lê dynasty (1459–1460)	Lê Nghi Dân's royal court	Loyal forces of Nguyễn Xí, Đinh Liệt and Lê Lăng	Throne change: Lê Nghi Dân killed; Lê Tư Thành (Lê Thánh Tông) installed as the Emperor by the loyal forces
Twelfth Champa–Đại Việt War (1471)	Đại Việt	Champa	Victory: Annexation of large portions of northern Champa by Đại Việt; Decline of Champa Kingdom
Đại Việt–Lan Xang War (1479–1484) or White Elephant War	Đại Việt	Lan Xang; Lan Na; Muang Phuan; Shan States	Defeat (see analysis): Sack of Xiangkhouang capital of Muang Phuan by Đại Việt; Đại Việt's troops withdrew from Lan Xang and Lanna; Laotian, Thai and Chinese sources claim coalitional victory while Vietnamese sources claim victory
Third throne crisis of Later Lê dynasty (1509)	Lê Uy Mục's royal court	Lê Oanh's rebel forces	Throne change: Lê Oanh (Lê Tương Dực) became the Emperor
Trần Tuân's rebellion (1511–1512)	Đại Việt	Trần Tuân (vi)	Victory
Trịnh Duy Sản's coup d'état (1516)	Lê Tương Dực's royal court	Rebel forces of Trịnh Duy Sản (vi), Trịnh Duy Đại and Lê Y	Throne change: Death of Lê Tương Dực; Trịnh Duy Đại installed Lê Quang Trị as new Emperor, but left Thăng Long for Thanh Hóa shortly after; Later Trịnh Duy Sản installed Lê Y (Lê Chiêu Tông) as new Emperor; Trịnh Duy Đại then killed Lê Quang Trị and rejoined Trịnh Duy Sản at Thăng Long; Decline of Later Lê dynasty
Trần Cảo's rebellion (1516–1521)	Đại Việt under Later Lê dynasty	Trần Cảo's rebel forces	Victory: Trần Cảo fled
Trịnh Tuy's coup d'état (1518–1522)	Lê Chiêu Tông's royal court; Mạc Đăng Dung's forces	Trịnh Tuy's rebel forces	Throne change: As Lê Chiêu Tông absent from court, Trịnh Tuy installed Lê Bảng and then Lê Do as Emperor in quick succession; Mạc Đăng Dung quelled the rebellion, consolidating power in the imperial court; Trịnh Tuy surrendered
Mạc Đăng Dung's coup d'état (1522–1526)	Lê Chiêu Tông's royal court Trịnh Tuy's forces	Mạc Đăng Dung's rebel forces	Dynasty change: Mạc Đăng Dung installed Lê Xuân (Lê Cung hoàng) as new Emperor for a short time; Mạc Đăng Dung became the Emperor later; Brief collapse of Later Lê dynasty; Establishment of Mạc dynasty

=== Mạc dynasty (1527–1677) ===
Conflict	Mac dynasty	Opponents	Result
Lê–Mạc War (1533–1677)	Mạc dynasty Bầu lords (from 1594); Political support: Ming dynasty	Revival Lê dynasty Bầu lords (1527–1593); Nguyễn lords (until 1600); Trịnh lords	Revival Lê dynasty victory: Mạc dynasty retreated to Cao Bằng in 1592, and collapse in 1677.; Rise of the Trịnh lords and Nguyễn lords.
Throne crisis of Mạc dynasty (1546–1547)	Mạc Phúc Nguyên's forces	Mạc Chính Trung's forces	Throne change: Mạc Phúc Nguyên became the Emperor; Decline of Mạc dynasty

==== Trịnh lord – Tonkin (1545–1787) ====
Conflict	Trinh lord	Opponents	Result
Bầu clan's rebellion (1594–1699)	Tonkin under Trịnh lord	Bầu clan	Victory: Bầu clan eliminated
Hoàng Công Chất's rebellion (1739–1769)	Tonkin under Trịnh lord	Hoàng Công Chất's forces	Victory
Lê Duy Mật's rebellion (1740–1770)	Tonkin under Trịnh lord	Lê Duy Mật's forces	Victory
Nguyễn Hữu Cầu's rebellion (1743–1751)	Tonkin under Trịnh lord	Nguyễn Hữu Cầu's forces	Victory
Nguyễn Danh Phương's rebellion (1744–1751)	Tonkin under Trịnh lord	Nguyễn Danh Phương's forces	Victory
Đại Việt–Luang Phrabang War (1749)	Tonkin under Trịnh lord	Luang Phrabang	Defeat: Trịnh's forces expelled from Luang Phrabang
Privileged Army Mutiny (1782–1786)	Tonkin under Trịnh lord	Soldiers from Thanh Hóa and Nghệ An provinces	Victory: Mutiny soldiers suppressed; Decline of Trịnh lord

==== Nguyễn lord – Cochinchina (1558–1777) ====
Conflict	Nguyen lord	Opponents	Result
First Đại Việt–Panduranga War (1611)	Cochinchina under Nguyễn lord	Panduranga	Victory: Annexation of present-day Phú Yên by Nguyễn lord
Dutch East India Company's attack (1643)	Cochinchina under Nguyễn lord	Dutch East India Company	Victory: Dutch East India Company's ships damaged and sunken
Second Đại Việt–Panduranga War (1653)	Cochinchina under Nguyễn lord	Panduranga	Victory: Nguyễn's forces occupied more Panduranga's territories
First Đại Việt-Cambodia War (1658)	Cochinchina under Nguyễn lord Ang Sur and Ang Tan's forces	Cambodia	Victory: Cambodian King Ramathipadi I captured
Second Đại Việt-Cambodia War (1674)	Cochinchina under Nguyễn lord Ang Nan II and Ang Tan's forces	Cambodia	Victory: Cambodian King Keo Fa II fled; Beginning of Cambodian throne crisis
Third Đại Việt–Panduranga War (1693–1697)	Cochinchina under Nguyễn lord	Panduranga	Defeat: Nguyễn's forces withdrew from some Panduranga's territories; Panduranga gained autonomy
Third Đại Việt-Cambodia War (1699)	Cochinchina under Nguyễn lord	Cambodia	Victory: Cambodian King Chey Chettha IV surrendered
Fourth Đại Việt-Cambodia War (1708)	Ang Em's forces Cochinchina under Nguyễn lord	Cambodia under Thommo Reachea III; Siam under Ayutthaya Kingdom	Victory: Cambodian King Thommo Reachea III fled to Siam
First Đại Việt-Siam War (1718)	Cochinchina under Nguyễn lord	Siam under Ayutthaya Kingdom	Defeat: Siamese forces destroyed Hà Tiên city
Fifth Đại Việt-Cambodia War (1753–1756)	Cochinchina under Nguyễn lord	Cambodia	Victory: Cambodian King Chey Chettha VII surrendered
Second Đại Việt-Siam War (1771–1772)	Cochinchina under Nguyễn lord Outey II's forces	Siam under Ayutthaya Kingdom; Ang Non II's forces	Defeat: Ang Non II became King of Cambodia; Nguyễn's forces withdrew from Cambodia; Decline of Nguyễn lord
Tây Sơn uprising (1771–1777)	Cochinchina under Nguyễn lord	Tây Sơn rebels	Dynasty change: Trịnh's forces joined Tây Sơn to defeat Nguyễn's forces; Nguyễn lord overthrown; Establishment of Tây Sơn dynasty in Cochinchina

==== Trịnh-Nguyễn War (1627–1775) ====
Conflict	Trinh lord	Nguyen lord	Result
First Trịnh-Nguyễn War (1627)	Đàng Ngoài under Trịnh Tráng	Đàng Trong under Nguyễn Phúc Nguyên	Defeat to Trịnh
Second Trịnh-Nguyễn War (1633–1640)	Đàng Ngoài	Đàng Trong	Defeat to Trịnh
Third Trịnh-Nguyễn War (1643)	Đàng Ngoài	Đàng Trong	Defeat to Nguyễn
Fourth Trịnh-Nguyễn War (1648)	Đàng Ngoài	Đàng Trong	Defeat to Trịnh
Fifth Trịnh-Nguyễn War (1655–1660)	Đàng Ngoài	Đàng Trong	Defeat to Nguyễn
Sixth Trịnh-Nguyễn War (1661–1662)	Đàng Ngoài	Đàng Trong	Defeat to Trịnh
Seventh Trịnh-Nguyễn War (1672)	Đàng Ngoài	Đàng Trong	Defeat to Trịnh: Gianh River became the border between Tonkin and Cochinchina; Đại Việt divided into 2 rival courts for more than 100 years
Eighth Trịnh-Nguyễn War (1774–1775)	Đàng Ngoài; Supported by: Tây Sơn rebels	Đàng Trong	Defeat to Nguyễn: Trịnh and Tây Sơn's troops occupied Phú Xuân capital of Cochinchina; Nguyễn lord overthrown

=== Tây Sơn dynasty (1778–1802) ===
Conflict	Tây Sơn dynasty and allies	Opponents	Brief description
Tây Sơn–Trịnh War (1775–1786)	Cochinchina under Tây Sơn dynasty	Tonkin under Trịnh lords	Dynasty change: End of Trịnh lords; Tây Sơn's forces occupied Tonkin briefly then withdrew; Later Lê dynasty remained as a ceremonial ruler of Tonkin
First Tây Sơn-Nguyễn War (1777–1785)	Cochinchina under Tây Sơn dynasty	Nguyễn lord's loyalists in Cochinchina	Territorial change: Nguyễn Ánh fled to Siam; Tây Sơn re-gained control of Cochinchina
Third Đại Việt-Siam War (1785)	Cochinchina under Tây Sơn dynasty	Rattanakosin Siam; Nguyễn Ánh's forces	Victory: Siam invasion repelled; Siamese army destroyed; Nguyễn Ánh fled to Siam again
Sixth Đại Việt-Cambodia War (1785)	Cochinchina under Tây Sơn dynasty	Cambodia	Victory
Nguyễn Huệ–Nguyễn Nhạc conflict (1787)	Nguyễn Nhạc's forces in Quy Nhơn	Nguyễn Huệ's forces in Phú Xuân	Indecisive: Đại Việt divided into 3 regions: Nguyễn Nhạc reigned in the Central; Nguyễn Huệ reigned in the North (Tonkin); Nguyễn Lữ reigned in the South (Cochinchina)
Tây Sơn-Lê War (1787–1789)	Cochinchina under Tây Sơn dynasty	Tonkin under Later Lê dynasty Supported by: Qing dynasty	Dynasty change: Tây Sơn dynasty reigned over Tonkin; Nguyễn Huệ crowned as Emperor of Đại Việt; End of Later Lê dynasty
Second Tây Sơn-Nguyễn War (1787–1802)	Đại Việt under Tây Sơn dynasty Supported by: Pirates of the South China Coast; Pro-Tây Sơn Chams forces	Nguyễn Ánh's forces in Cochinchina; Supported by: French mercenaries; Pro-Nguyễn Chams forces	Dynasty change: End of Tây Sơn dynasty; Establishment of Nguyễn dynasty; Nguyễn Ánh crowned as Emperor of Đại Việt
Đại Việt–Qing War (1788–1789)	Đại Việt under Tây Sơn dynasty	Qing dynasty Lê Chiêu Thống's forces	Victory: Qing invasion repelled; Qing army destroyed; Nguyễn Huệ (Quang Trung) proclaimed Emperor of Đại Việt; Qing recognized Quang Trung as official ruler of Đại Việt
Đại Việt-Vientiane War (1791)	Đại Việt under Tây Sơn dynasty	Vientiane; Muang Phuan; Lê's loyalists	Victory: Vientiane submitted to Đại Việt; Muang Phuan annexed into Đại Việt; Lê's loyalists eliminated

=== Nguyễn dynasty – Independent period (1802–1883) ===
Conflict	Nguyen dynasty	Opponents	Result
Đá Vách rebellion (1803–1885)	Việt Nam under Nguyễn dynasty	Ethnic minority people in Quảng Ngãi province	Victory
First Cambodian Rebellion (1811–1812)	Cambodia under Ang Chan II; Supported by: Việt Nam under Nguyễn dynasty	Ang Snguon's forces Supported by: Siam under Rattanakosin Kingdom	Victory: Ang Chan II retained the throne of Cambodia; Decline of Cambodia and increasing dependency on Nguyễn dynasty
Second Cambodian Rebellion (1820)	Cambodia under Ang Chan II; Supported by: Việt Nam under Nguyễn dynasty	Khmer rebels led by Monk Kai	Victory
Phan Bá Vành's rebellion (1821–1827)	Việt Nam under Nguyễn dynasty	Phan Bá Vành's forces	Victory
Ja Lidong's rebellion (1822–1823)	Việt Nam under Nguyễn dynasty	Chams rebels led by Ja Lidong	Victory
Lao rebellion (1826–1828)	Vientiane; Champasak; Supported by: Việt Nam under Nguyễn dynasty	Siam under Rattanakosin Kingdom	Defeat: Siam controlled Vientiane and Champasak
Nduai Kabait rebellion (1826)	Việt Nam under Nguyễn dynasty	Chams rebels led by Ndui Kabait	Victory
Lê Duy Lương's rebellion (1832–1837)	Việt Nam under Nguyễn dynasty	Lê Duy Lương's (vi) rebels	Victory
Lê Văn Khôi's revolt (1833–1835)	Việt Nam under Nguyễn dynasty	Lê Văn Khôi's rebels	Victory
Việt Nam-Siam War (1833–1834)	Việt Nam under Nguyễn dynasty	Siam under Rattanakosin Kingdom	Victory: Annexation of Tây Thành by Việt Nam; Siamese troops retreated
Nông Văn Vân's rebellion (1833–1835)	Việt Nam under Nguyễn dynasty	Nông Văn Vân's rebels	Victory
Ba Nhàn-Tiền Bột's rebellion (1833–1843)	Việt Nam under Nguyễn dynasty	Ba Nhàn and Tiền Bột's rebels	Victory
Ja Thak Wa and Katip Sumat's rebellion (1833–1835)	Việt Nam under Nguyễn dynasty	Chams rebels led by Ja Thak Wa and Katip Sumat	Victory
Hà Tiên rebellion (1840)	Đại Nam under Nguyễn dynasty	Khmer rebels in Hà Tiên	
Third Cambodian Rebellion (1840–1841)	Ang Mey's royal court Supported by: Đại Nam under Nguyễn dynasty	Ang Duong's rebel forces Supported by: Siam under Rattanakosin Kingdom	Defeat: Đại Nam's troops withdrew from Cambodia; Cambodia gained semi-independence but depended on Siam; Ang Duong crowned as King of Cambodia
Ba Xuyên's rebellion (1841)	Đại Nam under Nguyễn dynasty	Sơn Tốt and Trần Lâm's rebels	Victory
Thất Sơn's rebellion (1841)	Đại Nam under Nguyễn dynasty	Khmer rebels in Thất Sơn	Victory
Lâm Sâm's rebellion (1841)	Đại Nam under Nguyễn dynasty	Lâm Sâm's rebels	Victory
Đại Nam–Siam War (1841–1845)	Đại Nam under Nguyễn dynasty Ang Mey and Ang Em's forces	Siam under Rattanakosin Kingdom; Ang Duong's royal court	Indecisive: Joint Siam-Đại Nam suzerainty of Cambodia.
War against South China Sea pirates (1849)	Đại Nam under Nguyễn dynasty Qing dynasty	Pirates of the South China Coast	Victory
Cao Bá Quát's rebellion (1854–1856)	Đại Nam under Nguyễn dynasty	Cao Bá Quát's rebels	Victory
Cochinchina campaign (1858–1862)	Đại Nam under Nguyễn dynasty	Second French Empire; Kingdom of Spain	Defeat: Treaty of Saigon (1862); Cession of Biên Hòa, Gia Định, and Định Tường to the Second French Empire
Tạ Văn Phụng's rebellion (1861–1865)	Đại Nam under Nguyễn dynasty	Tạ Văn Phụng's rebels	Victory
Cai Vàng's rebellion (1862–1865)	Đại Nam under Nguyễn dynasty	Cai Vàng's rebels	Victory
War on South Chinese bandits (1865–1875)	Đại Nam under Nguyễn dynasty Qing dynasty Black Flag Army (from 1870)	Black Flag Army (until 1870); Yellow Flag Army; White Flag Army	Victory: Black Flag Army surrendered to Đại Nam; Yellow Flag Army and White Flag Army destroyed
Đoàn Hữu Trưng's rebellion (1866)	Đại Nam under Nguyễn dynasty	Đoàn Hữu Trưng's rebels	Victory
Tonkin expedition (1873–1874)	Đại Nam under Nguyễn dynasty Black Flag Army	French Third Republic	Indecisive: Commander Francis Garnier killed; Treaty of Saigon (1874); Cession of Châu Đốc, Hà Tiên and Vĩnh Long to the French Third Republic; French troops withdrew from Tonkin
Tonkin campaign (1883–1886)	Đại Nam under Nguyễn dynasty Qing dynasty Black Flag Army	French Third Republic	Defeat: Treaty of Huế (1883) and Treaty of Huế (1884); Tonkin and Annam became French protectorates; Nguyễn dynasty lost actual authority over Đại Nam

== Colonial era ==
=== French Indochina (1858–1945) ===
Conflict	Indochina	Opponents	Result
Trương Định's uprising (1859–1864)	Trương Định's forces in Cochinchina	Second French Empire	Defeat
Nguyễn Hữu Huân's uprising (1859–1874)	Nguyễn Hữu Huân's forces in Cochinchina	Second French Empire	Defeat
Nguyễn Trung Trực's uprising (1861–1868)	Nguyễn Trung Trực's forces in Cochinchina	Second French Empire	Defeat
Bảy Thưa's rebellion (1867–1873)	Trần Văn Thành's forces in Cochinchina	Second French Empire	Defeat
Sino–French War (1884–1885)	China; Black Flag Army	France	Defeat to Qing: French protectorates of Tonkin and Annam recognized by China
Yên Thế Insurrection (1884–1913)	Yên Thế Barracks: Trung Châu Insurgent Force; Black Flag Army Tai Canton	French Indochina: Tonkin Infantry Regiment	Victory of the French Forces : The uprising suppressed.; Yên Thế Barracks fallen.
Cần Vương movement (1885–1896)	Can Vuong's Rebels	France; Nguyễn dynasty	Defeat: Hàm Nghi captured and deposed of
Franco-Siamese conflict (1893)	(French Third Republic) France: French Indochina	Siam	French victory: Land on east bank of the Mekong ceded to French Indochina
Anti-tax Movement in Annam (1908)	People in Annam	French Third Republic; French Indochina; Nguyễn dynasty	Defeat
Hanoi Poison Plot (1908)	Mutiny ĐIndochinese soldiers and cooks in Tonkin	French Third Republic; French Indochina; Nguyễn dynasty	Defeat
N'Trang Lơng's uprising (1911–1935)	Montagnard tribes led by N'Trang Lơng in Central Highlands	French Third Republic; French Indochina	Defeat
Restoration League Movement (1913–1925)	Vietnam Restoration League	French Third Republic; French Indochina; Nguyễn dynasty	Defeat
Cochinchina uprising (1913–1916)	Cochinchina rebels led by Phan Xích Long	French Third Republic; French Indochina	Defeat
Thái Nguyên uprising (1917)	Đại Hùng Empire: Thái Nguyên Restoration Forces	French Indochina: Tonkinese Army	Victory of the French Forces : The uprising suppressed.; Đại Hùng Empire collapsed.
Red Phú Riềng Movement (1930)	Phú Riềng workers Communist Party of Indochina in Cochinchina	French Third Republic; French Indochina	Defeat
Yên Bái mutiny (1930)	Vietnam Nationalist Party: Vietnam Revolutionary Force	(France) Government of French Indochina: Tonkin Infantry Regiment; East French Air Force	Victory of the French forces.: Uprising crushed.; Some villages were massacred by French soldiers.; Division of the Nationalist Party.; Rebels severely damaged by arrests and executions by French authorities.; Many leaders had to escape to China.
Nghệ-Tĩnh Soviets (1930–1931)	Communist Party of Vietnam; Indochinese Communist Party; Communist Party of Annam; Red Self-Defense Force	French Indochina; French Protectorate of Annam; Nguyễn dynasty	French and Nguyễn dynasty victory: Communist uprising suppressed
Japanese invasion of French Indochina (1940)	Vichy France: French Indochina	Japan Vietnam National Restoration League: Vietnam National Building Force	Japanese victory: Japanese occupation of French Indochina from Lang Son.

=== Japanese Indochina (1940–1945) ===
Conflict	Indochina	Opponents	Result
Bắc Sơn uprising (1940)	Communist Party of Vietnam in Tonkin; Bắc Sơn's guerrilla forces	French State; Empire of Japan	Defeat
Franco–Thai War (1940–1941)	Vichy France: French Indochina	Thailand Supported by: Japan	Indecisive: Japanese-mediated armistice; Disputed territories in French Indochina ceded to Thailand
Cochinchina uprising (1940)	Indochinese Communist Party	Vichy France: French Indochina	French victory: Uprising suppressed
Đô Lương Mutiny (1941)	Mutiny Indochinese soldiers led by Đội Cung in Annam	French State	Defeat
South-East Asian theatre of World War II (1941–1945)	Allies United States: Philippine Commonwealth; United Kingdom and Empire: India; Australia; Canada; New Zealand; Kenya; Nigeria; Gold Coast; Straits Settlements; Malaya; Sarawak; North Borneo; Brunei; Hong Kong; Singapore; Burma; Ceylon; Gilbert and Ellice Islands; Solomon Islands; Fiji; Tonga; Netherlands: Dutch East Indies; (Thailand) Free Thai Movement; Free France: Việt Minh (Cambodia) Khmer Issarak Lao Issara; French West Africa; French Senegal; French Sudan; Upper Volta; French Guinea; Ivory Coast; Portuguese Timor	Axis Japan: Philippine Republic; Azad Hind; (Myanmar) State of Burma; Vietnam; Kampuchea; Luang Prabang; Indonesian National Party; Thailand Vichy France: French Indochina	Allied victory
Battles of Khai Phat and Na Ngan (1944)	(North Vietnam) Việt Minh (Armed Propaganda Unit)	(Provisional Government of the French Republic) France: French Indochina	Viet Minh victory
Japanese coup d'état (1945)	France: French Indochina; Việt Minh; Khmer Issarak Air support: United States	Empire of Japan: VNQDH; Đại Việt Quốc gia Cách mệnh Ủy viên Hội; Đại Việt National Socialist Party; Daiviet Populist Revolutionary Party; Tân Việt Nam Quốc dân Đảng; Đại Việt Dân chính Đảng; Empire of Vietnam; Kingdom of Kampuchea; Kingdom of Luang Prabang	Victory to Japan: Overthrow of French Indochina; Vichy French in Indochina surrendered; Foundation of Empire of Vietnam
Ba Tơ uprising (1945)	Communist Party of Vietnam in Annam; Ba Tơ's guerrilla forces	Empire of Japan; Provisional Government of the French Republic	Victory
August Revolution (1945)	Việt Minh: National Liberation Committee of Vietnam (from 16–25 August); Provisional Revolutionary Government of Democratic Republic of Vietnam (from 28 August); Vanguard Youth (from 22 August); Supported by: United States Bình Xuyên; Hòa Hảo; Cao Đài Trotskyist Vietnam Revolutionary League: Vietnamese Provisional National Government; Việt Quốc; Đại Việt Nationalist	Empire of Vietnam National Unified Front: Vanguard Youth (until 22 August); Supported by: Japan	Việt Minh victory: Abolishment of the Vietnamese monarchy on August 25; Establishment of the National Liberation Committee of Vietnam on August 16 and Provisional Revolutionary Government of Democratic Republic of Vietnam on August 28; Establishment of the Vietnamese Provisional National Government by the Vietnam Revolutionary League in Móng Cái on September 1; Declaration of the Democratic Republic of Vietnam on September 2; Conflicts between the communist Việt Minh and non-communists begins; Initial conflict between France and Vietnam breaks out on September 23; China occupies Vietnam, north of the 16th parallel

== Modern era ==
=== Democratic Republic of Vietnam – North Vietnam (1945–1976) ===
Conflict	North Vietnam and allies	Opponents	Result	Leader
Civil conflicts in Vietnam (1945–1949)	Việt Minh: Indochinese Communist Party; Buddhist Association for National Salvation; Pro-Viet Minh Caodaists; Catholic Association for National Salvation; Vanguard Youth (from 22 August 1945); Democratic Party of Vietnam; Pro-Viet-Minh Bình Xuyên (1945–1946) French Northern Indochina Command (1946)	Empire of Vietnam (1945): Đại Việt National Socialist Party; Nationalist Parties Front (1945–1946): Đại Việt QDĐ; Việt Nam QDĐ; Vietnam Revolutionary League; Đại Việt Duy dân Đảng; Vietnam Catholic Federation (from 1947); Vietnam National Restoration League Hòa Hảo; Vietnamese Democratic Socialist Party; Caodaists; Bình Xuyên; Pure Land Buddhist Laity Association Trotskyists Autonomous Republic of Cochinchina (1946-1948); Provisional Central Government of Vietnam (1948–1949) Republic of China (1945) French Union (1948–1949)	Partial Viet Minh victory: Non-communist nationalist parties and political organizations crushed.; Arrival of the Cold War in Indochina	
War in southern Vietnam (1945–1946)	Southern Resistance Committee of Viet Minh: Vanguard Youth; National Guard; Southern Provisional Administrative Committee; Vietnam People's Army; Pro-Viet Minh Bình Xuyên	British Empire: United Kingdom; India; France Japan Hòa Hảo Cao Đài Anti-communist Bình Xuyên Đại Việt Nationalist Party	Defeat: Restoration of French rule in southern Indochina.; Beginning of the First Indochina War.	
First Indochina War (1946–1954); Anti-French Resistance War	Democratic Republic of Vietnam: (North Vietnam) Việt Minh	French Union: France; French Indochina; State of Vietnam; Kingdom of Cambodia; Kingdom of Laos	Geneva Accords: Ceasefire in Indochina; Partition of Vietnam between North Vietnam and South Vietnam, population movement in 1954; Reaffirmed the independence of Vietnam, Laos and Cambodia	
Chinese Campaign to Suppress Bandits in Shiwandashan (1949)	People's Republic of China: Chinese Communist Party; Democratic Republic of Vietnam: (North Vietnam) Việt Minh	(Taiwan) Nationalist Chinese guerrilla forces in Shiwandashan Mountain	Victory to Communist China	
Vietnam War (1955–1975) (Note: The start date remains disputed, but North Vietnam did not directly intervene until 1959, and the United States not until 1965.)	North Vietnam; Viet Cong and PRG; Pathet Lao; Khmer Rouge; GRUNK (from 1970); China (1965–1969); Soviet Union; North Korea; Cuba; India; Czechoslovakia; Burma; Poland; East Germany; Romania; Mongolia; Bulgaria; Iraq; Indonesia (1959–1966); Sweden; Hungary; Albania	South Vietnam; United States; South Korea; Canada; Australia; New Zealand; Japan; United Kingdom; Turkey; Laos; Cambodia (1967–1970); Khmer Republic (1970–1975); Thailand; Iran; Indonesia (1966–1973); Philippines; Taiwan; France; West Germany; Netherlands; Italy; Pakistan; Spain; Malaysia; Singapore	Communist victory: US and allies' withdrawal from Vietnam.; Communist takeover of South Vietnam.; Reunification of Vietnam into Socialist Republic of Vietnam.	Ho Chi Minh; Lê Duẩn
Laotian Civil War (1959–1975)	Pathet Lao; North Vietnam; Neutralists (1960–1962); Patriotic Neutralists (1963–1969)	Kingdom of Laos; Neutralists (1962–1966); United States; South Vietnam (until 1975); Thailand; Republic of China (until 1967)	Victory to Pathet Lao: Establishment of Lao People's Democratic Republic.	Ho Chi Minh; Lê Duẩn
Communist insurgency in Thailand (1965–1983)	Communist Party of Thailand: People's Liberation Army of Thailand; Federation of Farmers and Workers; National Student Center of Thailand; Ethnic groups, especially the Hmong; Pathet Lao; Malayan Communist Party; Communist Party of Burma; Supported by: Khmer Rouge (until 1978); People's Republic of Kampuchea (since 1979); People's Republic of China (until 1980); North Vietnam	Thailand: Royal Thai Armed Forces; Royal Thai Police; Border Patrol Police; Volunteer Defense Corps; Thahan Phran; Internal Security Operations Command; Village Scouts; Nawaphon; Red Gaurs; Kingdom of Laos (until 1975); ROC 93rd Division; Malaysia; Supported by: United States; Shan United Revolutionary Army; Karen National Union	Defeat to Communist Party of Thailand: Thai government victory and amnesty in 1980.; Communist insurgency declined.	Ho Chi Minh; Lê Duẩn
Cambodian Civil War (1968–1975)	(Democratic Kampuchea) Khmer Rouge; (Cambodia) GRUNK (1970–1975); (Cambodia) FUNK; (Cambodia) Khmer Rumdo; North Vietnam; (Provisional Revolutionary Government of the Republic of South Vietnam) Viet Cong; (Laos) Pathet Lao	(Kingdom of Cambodia (1953–1970)) Kingdom of Cambodia (1967–1970); Khmer Republic (1970–1975); (Khmer Republic) Khmer Serei (until 1972); United States; South Vietnam; Kingdom of Laos FULRO	Victory to Khmer Rouge: Establishment of Democratic Kampuchea.; Beginning of Cambodian genocide.	Tôn Đức Thắng

=== State of Vietnam and Republic of Vietnam – South Vietnam (1949–1975) ===
Conflict	South Vietnam and allies	Opponents	Result	Leader
1955 South Vietnamese conflict	(State of Vietnam) Pro-Ngô Đình Diệm groups: (State of Vietnam) National Revolutionary Committee; Personalist Labor Revolutionary Party; Vietnamese National Army; Supported by: United States	(State of Vietnam) Pro-Bảo Đại groups: (State of Vietnam) National All-Power United Front; Bình Xuyên; Hoà Hảo; Cao Đài; Vietnam Nationalist Party; Đại Việt Nationalist Party; Supported by: France	Regime change: Victory to Prime Minister Ngô Đình Diệm.; Chief of State Bảo Đại deposed of.; Ngô Đình Diệm became president.; Establishment of Republic of Vietnam.	Bảo Đại
First South Vietnamese coup d'état (1960)	ARVN loyalists Presidential Guard	ARVN rebels RVNMD rebels RVNAD rebels	Victory: Coup failed.	Ngô Đình Diệm
Buddhist crisis (1963)	(South Vietnam) South Vietnamese government: Army of the Republic of Vietnam Special Forces; Vietnamese Catholic loyalists	Buddhists of South Vietnam	Indecisive: Beginning of the 1963 South Vietnamese coup.	Ngô Đình Diệm
Second South Vietnamese coup d'état (1963)	Diệm government: National Assembly; Ministry of National Defense; ARVN loyalists; Presidential Guard; Army of the Republic of Vietnam Special Forces; Republic of Vietnam Navy; Republic of Vietnam Air Force; Cần Lao Party; Catholics loyalists	Republic of Vietnam Military Forces rebels Joint General Staff: I Corps; III Corps; Capital Military Zone Unit; Army of the Republic of Vietnam rebels; 5th Division; Republic of Vietnam Marine Division; Republic of Vietnam Airborne Division; Republic of Vietnam Air Force rebels; Supported by: United States; CIA; Caravelle Manifesto group; VNQDĐ; ĐVQDĐ	Defeat: Coup success.; Revolutionary Military Council seized power.; Ngô Đình Diệm and Ngô Đình Nhu arrested and assassinated.; Loyalist commanders Lê Quang Tung and Hồ Tấn Quyền summarily executed.; Ngô Đình Cẩn arrested; tried and executed in May 1964.; Republic of Vietnam weakened and became more dependent on the United States.	Ngô Đình Diệm
Third South Vietnamese coup d'état (1/1964)	Military Revolutionary Council of South Vietnam	Army of the Republic of Vietnam (ARVN) rebels	Defeat: Coup success.; Military junta led by Dương Văn Minh ousted from power.; Nguyễn Khánh seized power.	Dương Văn Minh
1964 FLHP rebellion	South Vietnam	FLHP	Victory	Nguyễn Khánh; Dương Văn Minh; Phan Khắc Sửu; Nguyễn Văn Thiệu.
Fourth South Vietnamese coup d'état (9/1964)	South Vietnam: Army of the Republic of Vietnam (ARVN) ruling junta	Army of the Republic of Vietnam (ARVN) rebels	Victory: Coup defeated.; Nguyễn Cao Kỳ and Nguyễn Chánh Thi gained more power over junta leader Nguyễn Khánh.	Nguyễn Khánh
Fifth South Vietnamese coup d'état (12/1964)	(South Vietnam) High National Council other civilian politicians	Army of the Republic of Vietnam (ARVN)	Defeat: Coup success.; Dissolution of High National Council.; Nguyễn Khánh political victory.	Nguyễn Khánh
Sixth South Vietnamese coup d'état (1965)	South Vietnam: Army of the Republic of Vietnam ruling junta	Army of the Republic of Vietnam rebels	Victory: Original coup defeated.; Nguyễn Cao Kỳ and Nguyễn Chánh Thi then forced Nguyễn Khánh from power and into exile.	Nguyễn Khánh
Buddhist Uprising (1966)	(South Vietnam) RVN Government: ARVN; National Police	ARVN rebels Buddhist monks	Victory	Nguyễn Văn Thiệu
Northeast Cay incident (1968)	South Vietnam	Philippines	Defeat: Capture of Northeast Cay and Southwest Cay in Spratly Islands by Philippines.	Nguyễn Văn Thiệu
Southwest Cay incident (1970)	South Vietnam	Philippines	Victory: Recapture of Southwest Cay in Spratly Islands by Republic of Vietnam.	Nguyễn Văn Thiệu
Battle of the Paracel Islands (1974)	South Vietnam: Republic of Vietnam Navy	China: People's Liberation Army Navy of China	Defeat: Capture of Paracel Islands by China.	Nguyễn Văn Thiệu

== Unification era ==
=== Socialist Republic of Vietnam (1976–present) ===
Conflict	Vietnam and allies	Opponents	Result	Leader
FULRO insurgency (1964–1992)	Communist forces: North Vietnam (1964–1976) (Provisional Revolutionary Government of the Republic of South Vietnam) Viet Cong (until 1975); Vietnam (after 1976); People's Republic of Kampuchea (1979-1989) Khmer Rouge (1967-1975)	FULRO: BAJARAKA; FLC; FLHP; FLKK; Supported by: China; Cambodia; Khmer Republic (1970-1975); GRUNK; Khmer Rouge (1975-1992); United States (1970–1975); France (1974–1992) Anti-communist forces: South Vietnam (1964–1975); United States (1964–1972)	Victory	Lê Duẩn (until July 1986); Trường Chinh (July–December 1986); Nguyễn Văn Linh (1986–1991); Đỗ Mười (from)
Cambodian-Vietnamese border skirmish (1975–1978)	Vietnam	Democratic Kampuchea	Victory: Cambodian invasion repelled.	Lê Duẩn
Insurgency in Laos (1975–2007)	Lao PDR: Lao People's Revolutionary Party; Supported by: Vietnam: Vietnam People's Army (alleged direct involvement and intervention); Soviet Union (until 1989)	Lao Resistance Movement; Hmong insurgents; Supported by: Thailand (until 1990); United States (until 1990); (Kingdom of Laos) Neo Hom (1981–2007); Royalists: Lao National Liberation Front; Royal Lao Democratic Government (1982); Supported by: Royal Lao Government in Exile; China (until 1988) (Cambodia) Khmer Rouge (until 1999): (Cambodia) Democratic Kampuchea (until 1979); (Cambodia) Party of Democratic Kampuchea (1981–1990); Rightists: United Front for the Liberation of Laos; Supported by: Thailand (early to mid–1980s)	Victory to Laos	Lê Duẩn (until July 1986); Trường Chinh (July–December 1986); Nguyễn Văn Linh (1986–1991); Đỗ Mười (1991–1997); Lê Khả Phiêu (1997–2001); Nông Đức Mạnh (from 2001)
Cambodian–Vietnamese War (1978–1989)	Vietnam; FUNSK (from 1978) Post-invasion: Until April 1989: Vietnam; People's Republic of Kampuchea; Cuba (reconstruction experts); From April 1989: State of Cambodia	Democratic Kampuchea (1978–1982); Thailand (border clashes) Post-invasion: Coalition Government of Democratic Kampuchea (from 1982): Khmer Rouge; KPNLF; FUNCINPEC; Thailand (border clashes)	Inconclusive: Removal of the Khmer Rouge from power.; Establishment of People's Republic of Kampuchea.; Vietnamese withdrawal from Cambodia in 1989.; 1991 Paris Peace Accords.	Lê Duẩn (until July 1986); Trường Chinh (July–December 1986); Nguyễn Văn Linh (from 1986)
Vietnamese border raids in Thailand (1979–1989)	Vietnam; People's Republic of Kampuchea (1979–89); State of Cambodia (1989)	Thailand; CGDK: PDK (Khmer Rouge); KPNLF; FUNCINPEC	Victory: Destruction of numerous Khmer Rouge's guerrilla bases and refugee camps along Thai-Cambodian border.	Lê Duẩn (until July 1986); Trường Chinh (July–December 1986); Nguyễn Văn Linh (from 1986)
Sino–Vietnamese War (1979)	Vietnam	China	Stalemate: Both sides claimed victory.; Chinese withdrawal from northern Vietnam.	Lê Duẩn
Sino-Vietnamese border conflicts (1979 – 1991)	Vietnam	China	Stalemate: China occupied some Vietnamese areas briefly and retreated.; Normalization of bilateral relations.	Lê Duẩn (until July 1986); Trường Chinh (July–December 1986); Nguyễn Văn Linh (1986–1991); Đỗ Mười (from 1991)
Johnson South Reef Skirmish (1988)	Vietnam	China	Defeat: Capture of Johnson South Reef by China.	Nguyễn Văn Linh
Cambodian Internal Conflict (1993–1998)	People's Republic of Kampuchea (1979–1989); Vietnam (1979–1989); Supported by: Albania (1979–1989); Soviet Union (1979–1989) State of Cambodia (from 1989)	Coalition Government of Democratic Kampuchea: PDK (Khmer Rouge); KPNLF; FUNCINPEC (from 1981) Supported by: Thailand (until 1991) China United States United Kingdom	Victory to Cambodia: Khmer Rouge surrendered.	Đỗ Mười (until 1997); Lê Khả Phiêu (from 1997)

== Citations ==
=== Works cited ===
- Ngô Sĩ Liên (1993). Đại Việt sử ký toàn thư (PDF) (in Vietnamese) (Nội các quan bản ed.). Hanoi: Social Science Publishing House.
- Quốc sử quán triều Nguyễn [National History Institute of the Nguyen Dynasty] (1884). Khâm Định Việt Sử Thông Giám Cương Mục [The Imperially Ordered Annotated Text Completely Reflecting the History of Viet] (PDF) (in Vietnamese). Hanoi: Education Publishing House.
- Unknown historian (1377). Đại Việt sử lược (PDF) (in Vietnamese). Vol. II: King Thái Tổ.
