= Trần Cao rebellion =

1516–21 uprising against the Lê dynasty of Vietnam

Tran Cao rebellion
Date	1516–1521
Location	Đại Việt
Result	Defeat of the rebels. Lê dynasty weakened by ensuing civil war.

Belligerents
Trần Cao rebels	Lê dynasty

Commanders and leaders
Trần Cao; Trần Cung	Lê Tương Dực; Lê Chiêu Tông; Trịnh Duy Sản; Mạc Đăng Dung

The Trần Cao rebellion in 1516 is a rebellion in 16th century Vietnam, led by Trần Cao against the Lê dynasty and is regarded as an important factor leading to the collapse of the Early period Lê. It was the second rebellion led against the Lê, following an uprising led by Tŕân Tuân in 1511.

== Background ==
The Lê dynasty was established by Emperor Lê Lợi in 1428 after expelling the Ming dynasty of China, which had occupied Annam. In 1460, one of his successors, Lê Thánh Tông, rose to the throne, beginning what was regarded as a golden age in Vietnamese history. During his rule of 37 years, Lê Thánh Tông instituted wide-ranging political and structural organisation of the country, implementing a Confucian model of government, introducing a mandarin system of government, expanding education, science, and art. He also expanded Đại Việt's territory substantially. At the time, Đại Việt was confined to the area around the Red River Delta, but Lê Thánh Tông expanded Đại Việt's army and expanded south towards Huế in what is now central Vietnam by conquering Champa territory. He also pushed westwards into the hills against the Tai. However, after his death, Đại Việt fell into disarray as a succession of weak emperors came and went, and palace intrigue crippled the country. This caused public discontent and set the scene for popular uprising.

The first significant rebellion, that of Tran Tuan in 1511, is largely lost to history. However, it is known that he was a charismatic figure who quickly gathered thousands of followers in eastern Hưng Hóa and western Sơn Tây provinces, and moved them directly against the capital Thăng Long, now modern-day Hanoi. On arrival they defeated the army of Trịnh Duy Sản, the head of aristocratic the Trịnh family which was part of the ruling dynasty. The royalists left Thăng Long defenceless and its people in panic. Shortly after, Tuan was killed by unlucky chance and his rebels were massacred. He was reported to have been dressed in red at the time, suggesting that he may have been a Taoist sorcerer. One of his followers rebelled again in the same region the following year but was isolated and defeated.

== Uprising ==
Like the Tran Tuan revolt of 1511, Trần Cảo's rebellion was also regarded as a simple peasant rebellion. Contrary views hold that both were revolts of the peripheral powers against the central administration led by charismatic figures bent on striking directly at the political and symbolic heart of the Lê dynasty. These two uprisings shared a pattern that set them apart from virtually all later Vietnamese peasant rebellions, which were much more locally oriented. Although they were clearly opposed to central control, later rebellions generally focused their discontent on local representatives by attacking district and provincial posts. They usually roamed the countryside intimidating landlords and pillaging opposing villages, allowing government forces in the capital enough time to organize an effective response.

The Trần Cảo rebellion exhibited none of these characteristics. Cao based his bid for the throne on a combination of genealogical and spiritual platform that balanced maternal and paternal lineage and doctrinal Buddhist and folk elements. Cảo claimed direct descent from the founder of the former Trần dynasty and membership of the family of Lê Thánh Tông's mother. Spiritually, he proclaimed himself as an incarnation of Indra and as the fulfillment of a popular prophecy. This combination quickly gave rise to a large following in his home district of Thuy Duong and the adjacent Đông Triều, where "all bowed down to him like grass before the wind". In early 1516, Cảo recruited fighters at Quynh Lam Pagoda in Đông Triều, a religious site reputed to have miraculous powers. After shaving their heads, he marched them unopposed, ten thousand strong, through the Kinh Bac districts of Que Duong and Tiên Du, down to the plains of Gia Lâm to Từ Liêm in Sơn Tây Province. This march took little more than ten days. With the insurgents only separated from the capital by the river, Trịnh Duy Sản murdered the emperor Lê Tương Dực and fled with his puppet successor Lê Chiêu Tông, leaving the capital undefended.

This time, chaos ensued. A rival general, Nguyễn Hoàng Dụ, turned his army loose to raze and loot. The inhabitants of the capital seized their chance to loot the palaces and administrative buildings of the hated former king, Tương Dực. During the confusions, Trần Cảo's forces marched into the capital, destroying the Lê dynastic temple and proclaiming a new reign. These events dealt a heavy blow to Lê prestige and legitimacy, as well as its capacity to rule. The court annals noted that "After Tran Cao entered the Capital and the dynastic temple was sacked, after [Nguyễn Hoàng Dụ's army] rebelled and the Capital was deserted", they wrote, "seeing this was enough to know that the Le could no longer prosper".

Even when the battling generals decided to ally against the rebels, it took months to push them back to their Hải Dương stronghold. They fought at least one major battle, at Sung Nghiem, before retreating to the Kinh Bac area until royal forces finally overcame in 1521. Before that, Trần Cảo had already transferred power to his son and became a monk. He then disappeared into the countryside, notwithstanding a reward of three hundred taels of gold and two thousand ares of land for his capture. The failure to apprehend him was despite the efforts of the populace who might have sought it, blaming him for the high death toll in Đông Triều, Giap Son, Yen Phong, Tiên Du, and Dong Ngan caused by starvation after vengeful Lê royalists razed the area. He is believed to have died in far north-eastern Kinh Bac (later Lạng Sơn Province). At the end of the seventeenth century, nearly two hundred years later, three villages in Bảo Lộc district still worshipped his cult.

== Sources ==
- Cooke, Nola (September 1994). "Nineteenth-century Vietnamese Confucianization in historical perspective: evidence from the palace examinations (1463–1883)". Journal of Southeast Asian Studies. 25 (2): 270–313. doi:10.1017/S0022463400013515.
