= Trần Cảo =

Trần Cảo may refer to:

- Trần Cảo (king), king of Vietnam (1426–1428) at the end of the Ming domination
- Trần Cảo (rebel leader) (died after 1525), Vietnamese rebel leader at the end of the Lê Dynasty
  - Trần Cảo Rebellion, 1516–1521, rebellion against the Lê Dynasty led by Trần Cảo

== See also ==
- Trần Cao Vân (1866–1916), mandarin of the Nguyễn Dynasty
