= Lê Quang Trị =

Lê Quang Trị 黎光治
- Emperor of Annam
- Reign: 1516
- Predecessor: Lê Tương Dực
- Successor: Lê Chiêu Tông
- Born: 1508; Đông Đô, Annam
- Died: 1516 (aged 8); Tây Đô, Annam
- Burial: Tây Đô
Names
- Lê Quang Trị (黎光治)
Era dates
- Hồng Thuận (洪順)
- House: Later Lê dynasty
- Father: Lê Doanh
- Mother: Trịnh Thị

Lê Quang Trị (chữ Hán: 黎光治, 1508–1516) was briefly emperor of Later Lê dynasty in 1516.

== Biography ==
Lê Quang Trị was born in 1508 at Đông Kinh. He was the son of prince Lê Doanh who was killed by emperor Lê Uy Mục in 1509. He became emperor in 1516 with the support of generals Phùng Mại and Trịnh Duy Đại. However, Trịnh Duy Đại was defeated in battle by his cousin Trịnh Duy Sản who supported Lê Y. So he received Lê Quang Trị to Tây Đô about May 1516, then he killed Lê Quang Trị and the emperor's two brothers. Lê Quang Trị only kept the throne for three days.

時惟㦃旣弑帝，乃與宗室大臣謀，欲立穆懿王子光治，武佐侯馮邁爭議立錦江王漴長子椅，祥郡公馮穎使力士殺邁於禁中議事堂，遂立光治。時年八歳。纔三日，未及改元，鄭惟岱將歸西都。

— Complete annals of Daiviet

Preceded by Lê Tương Dực	Emperor of Annam; 1522–1527	Succeeded by Lê Chiêu Tông
