= Mạc Đăng Dung =

Mạc Thái Tổ 莫太祖
- Emperor of Đại Việt
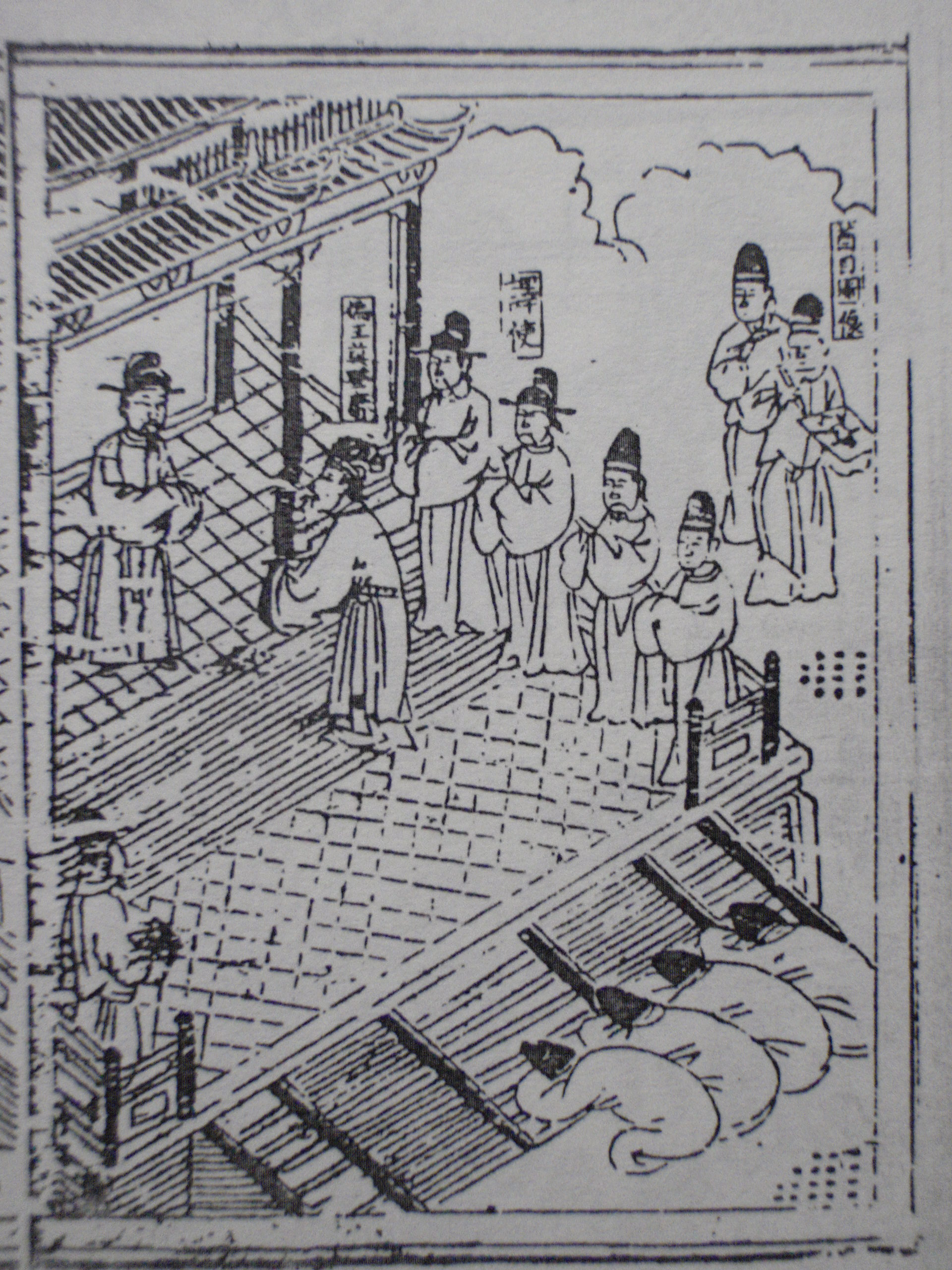
- Emperor Mạc Đăng Dung was making a symbolic gesture to receive the recognition of the Ming Dynasty through their ambassador Mao Bowen. South Suppressing Pass in 1540.

Emperor of Đại Việt
- Reign: 15 June 1527 – 1529
- Predecessor: Lê Cung Hoàng (Later Lê Dynasty)
- Successor: Mạc Thái Tông

Retired emperor of the Mạc Dynasty
- Reign: 1530–1541
- Born: 23 November 1483; Cổ Trai village, Hải Dương canton, Sơn Nam garrison
- Died: 22 August 1541 (aged 57); Cổ Trai village, Dương Kinh, Sơn Nam Thượng garrison
- Spouse: Nguyễn Thị Ngọc Toàn
Names
- Mạc Đăng Dung (莫登庸)
Era dates
- Minh Đức (明德)
Posthumous name
- Nhân Minh Cao Emperor (仁明高皇帝)
Temple name
- Thái Tổ (太祖)
- House: Mạc Dynasty
- Father: Mạc Hịch
- Mother: Đặng Thị Hiếu

Mạc Đăng Dung (chữ Hán : 莫登庸; 23 November 1483 – 22 August 1541), also known by his temple name Mạc Thái Tổ (莫太祖), was an emperor of Vietnam and the founder of the Mạc dynasty. Previously a captain of the imperial guard (Praetorian Prefect equivalent) of one of the Lê dynasty emperors, he gradually rose to a position of great power. Mạc eventually deposed the last Lê monarch, executed Lê Chiêu Tông and Lê Cung Hoàng, and became a monarch himself.

== From bodyguard to emperor ==
The Ming's ethnic Vietnamese collaborators included Mac Thuy, whose grandfather was Mạc Đĩnh Chi, who was a direct ancestor of Mạc Đăng Dung.

Mạc Đăng Dung (left) portraited in Chinese book "安南來威圖冊"

He was born Mạc Đăng Dung (莫登庸) on 23 November 1483 (Quý Mão in the sexagenary cycle) at the village of Cổ Trai, Nghi Dương district (modern Kiến Thụy, part of Haiphong city) as a fisherman's son.

Mạc Đăng Dung got his start as a bodyguard to the Lê Emperor Lê Uy Mục. Mạc Đăng Dung was a military man who rose through the ranks.

After a series of political crises that made both Lê Uy Mục and his successor Lê Tương Dực assassinated, Mạc Đăng Dung continued to gain power and rank in the military. With the enthronement of the young emperor Lê Chiêu Tông in 1516, a power struggle in the court, along with Trần Cao rebellion lead the country to the level of a civil war. From 1516 to 1520, the warlords of Nguyễn Hoàng Dụ and Trịnh Duy Sản, Nguyễn Kính and Trần Cao were fighting for power. Mạc Đăng Dung initially led the forces loyal to King Lê Chiêu Tông against the warlords, he eventually defeated the warlords and gained enough power to force Lê Chiêu Tông to abdicate in 1522 and illegally promote the Emperor Lê Cung Hoàng to the throne. Lê Chiêu Tông fled the court with the support of the warlord Trịnh Tuy to Thanh Hóa where he fought against Mạc Đăng Dung until being captured in 1526.

In 1527, Mạc Đăng Dung had both Lê Chiêu Tông and Lê Cung Hoàng killed. He then proclaimed himself the new emperor of the Mạc dynasty.

== Emperor Minh Đức ==
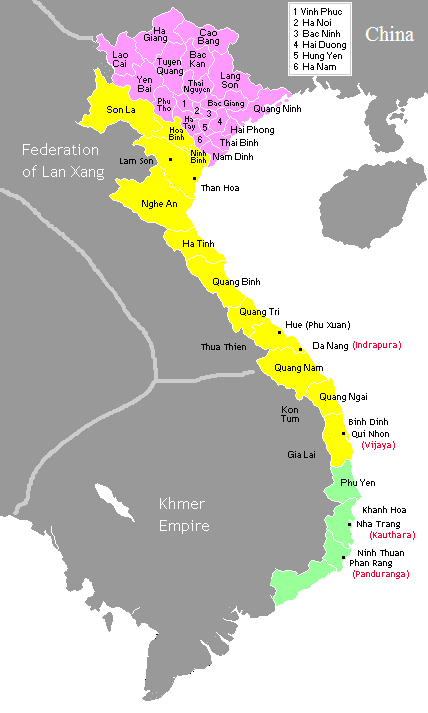
Map of Vietnam showing the Mac in control of the north of Vietnam while the Nguyễn-Trịnh alliance controls the south and central part.

Mạc Đăng Dung proclaimed himself the new emperor of Vietnam under the name Minh Đức. Using ruthless methods, he forced the Lê officials to recognize his dynasty and he murdered the members of the Lê family who still remained in the north including the deposed emperor Lê Cung Hoàng and his mother. Some government officials committed suicide rather than acknowledge Mạc Đăng Dung as emperor, others fled south and joined the resistance.

Another rebellion was launched, this time under the leadership of Nguyễn Kim and his son-in-law Trịnh Kiểm. In 1533, Nguyễn Kim installed Lê Trang Tông, a son of Lê Chiêu Tông who were exiled to Laos, to restore the Lê throne. From Thanh Hóa, the restored Lê dynasty began its resistance against the Mạc. Appeals from the Trịnh and Nguyễn were made to the Chinese Ming court to send in an army to remove the usurper. However Mạc Đăng Dung, using submissive behavior and bribery, managed to obtain a temporary recognition of his rule from the Ming dynasty in 1528.

In 1529 Mạc Đăng Dung abdicated in favor of his son, Mạc Đăng Doanh.

== Retirement and rule again ==
Mạc Đăng Dung lived on as a retired emperor while his son had to deal with the continuing revolt by the Trịnh and the Nguyễn. His son was not the equal of his father and as a result of several defeats, he lost control of the provinces south of the Red River. In 1533, the Nguyễn-Trịnh army conquered the Winter Palace and proclaimed Lê Trang Tông the rightful ruler of Vietnam.

Adding to the problems of military defeats, an official Chinese delegation determined that Mạc Đăng Dung's usurpation was not justified and so, in 1537 a very large army was dispatched to Vietnam under the pretense of restoring the Lê family to power. In the summer, with the Chinese invading the north, Dung's son Doanh died and so Dung resumed his former position as emperor.

The Ming Chinese threatened Mạc Đăng Dung with an invasion of 110,000 men ready to invade Vietnam from Guangxi in 1540. Mac succumbed and caved in to Chinese pressure and accepted the bitter demands the Chinese made, including crawling barefoot in front of the Chinese, giving up land to China, downgrading the status of his polity from a country to a chieftaincy and giving up official documents like tax registers to the Ming. The Chinese accepted him as ruler over a part of Vietnam while he claimed to accept Lê rule over the southern part of Vietnam. But the Nguyễn and the Trịnh refused to accept this division and so the war continued in the south.

Mạc Đăng Dung died in 1541 and de facto authority was transferred to his grandson Mạc Hiến Tông.

Despite the Chinese recognition and his rule over much of Vietnam, later Vietnamese historians question the legitimacy of his reign. The usurpation by Mạc Đăng Dung split the kingdom, with the Mạc dynasty reigning in the north, and the Lê dynasty continuing in the south, supported by the Trịnh lords and the Nguyễn lords.

Preceded by Lê Chiêu Tông	Emperor of Vietnam (Northern); 1527–1529	Succeeded by Mac Thai Tong
