= Siege of Songping =

9th-century siege battle in Southeast Asia

Siege of Songping (863)
- Part of Tang-Nanzhao war in Annan
| Date | Spring 863 (14 January – 1 March, 1 month 15 days) |
| Location | Songping, Protectorate of Annan (present-day Hanoi, Vietnam) 21°01′42″N 105°51′15″E |
| Result | Nanzhao victory: Temporary Nanzhao occupation of the Red River Delta; Weakening of the Tang dynasty |

Belligerents
| Nanzhao | Tang dynasty |

Commanders and leaders
| Duan Qiuqian; Yang Sijin; Chu Đạo Cổ | Cai Xi † |

Strength
| 50,000 | Unknown |

Casualties and losses
| Unknown | Unknown |
- Location of the battle

The siege of Songping was one of the great victories of Nanzhao during its invasion of the Tang dynasty in 863. Nanzhao took advantage of turmoil in the Tang Protectorate General to Pacify the South (Annan) and allied with local tribes to invade the Tang dynasty, which ruled the Red River Delta in modern-day northern Vietnam. The siege took place at Songping (modern-day Hanoi), capital of the Annan Protectorate, in early 863 during the reign of Emperor Yizong. The siege ended in victory for Nanzhao although their forces were later driven back by a Tang counterattack by 866.

== Background ==
Nanzhao was a powerful kingdom to the southwest of the Tang dynasty. Due to the mismanagement of the Tang governor Li Zhuo in Annan in 854, the native chieftains in the region defected to Nanzhao and attacked Tang forces. The chieftain Lý Do Độc submitted to the Nanzhao king Shilong, who sent military forces to attack Songping, the capital of Annan, in 858. The attack was repelled by Tang forces. However due to further mismanagement and the killing of a Viet leader, local clans in Annan continued to defect to Nanzhao.

Another Nanzhao invasion in 860 briefly took Songping before being driven back by a Tang army. Songping was taken again in early 861 when the Đỗ family, who were one of the primary factions that were wronged by the Tang administration, led 30,000 men and Nanzhao contingents to seize Annan. Songping fell on 17 January 861 and the Tang administration, Li Hu, fled to Yongzhou. Li Hu retook Songping on 21 July but Nanzhao's forces maneuvered around the Tang army and seized Yongzhou. Li Hu was banished to Hainan island and was replaced by Wang Kuan, who sought to appease local sentiment by bestowing titles on the Đỗ family and apologizing for killing their leaders.

A relief army of 30,000 men was sent to Songping but soon left the city when rivalry broke out between Cai Xi, the military governor, and Cai Jing, an administrative and military official of Lingnan. Cai Xi was then left responsible for holding Songping against an imminent Nanzhao offensive. The city was surrounded by 4 miles (6,344 meters) of moated rampart–some parts seven to eight meters high. East of the city was the Red River. Much of the information about the battle was written by Fan Chuo, a Tang official who wrote an eyewitness account about the southern barbarians (people of Annan and Yunnan) during the siege.

== Siege ==
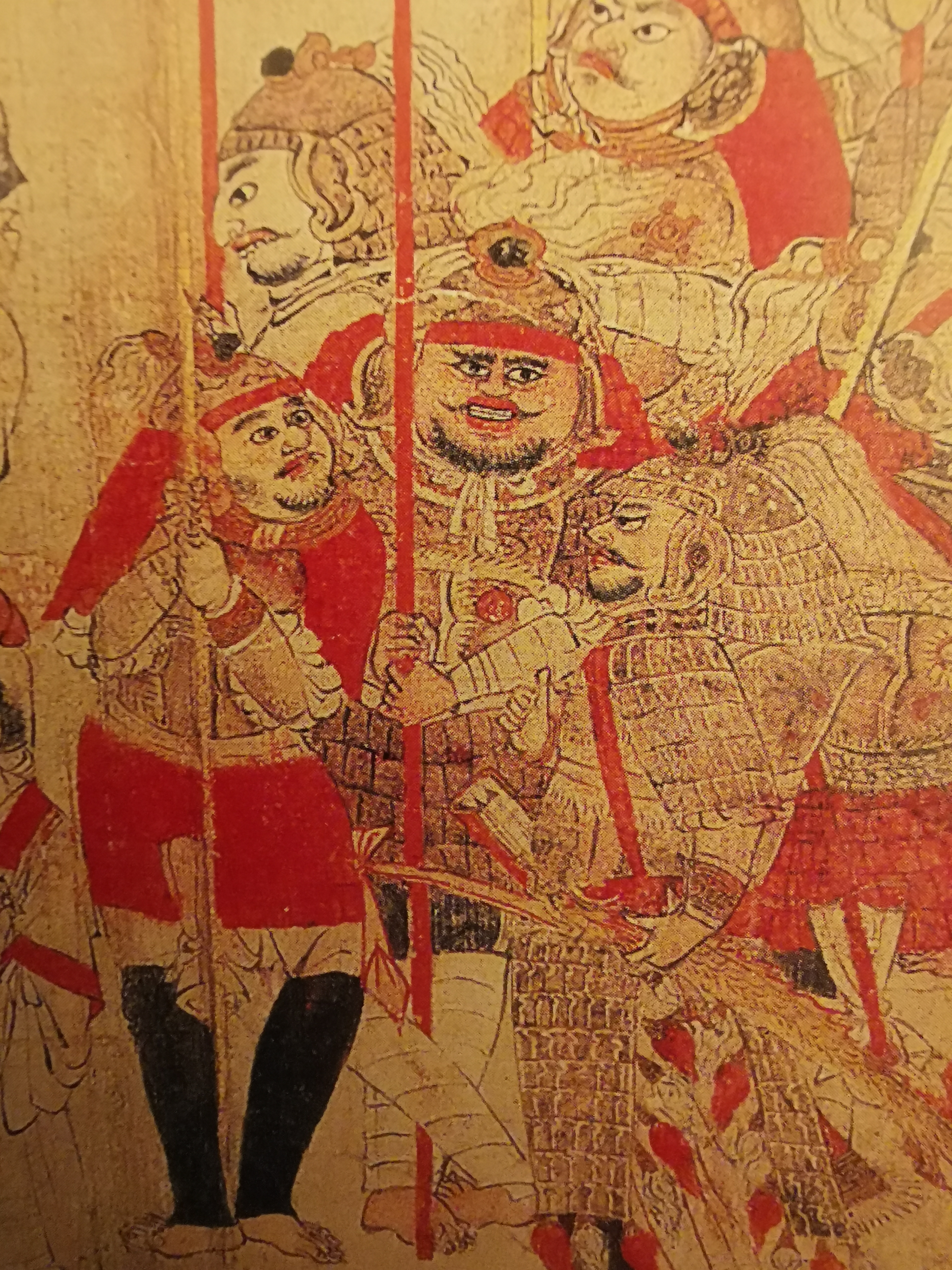
Soldiers of Dali Kingdom, the successor state of Nanzhao

In mid-January of 863, Nanzhao returned with an invasion force numbering 50,000 led by Duan Qiuqian and Yang Sijin and besieged Annan's capital Songping. Nanzhao's army included an assortment of Man tribes. There were 5–6,000 local Taohua forces, 2–3,000 Mang Man from west of the Mekong River who wore red silk around their head with blue trousers and canes and strips of bamboo on their waists, Luoxing Man who wore no clothes except tree bark, He Man from the borderlands, Xunjuan Man who went barefoot but could tread on brambles and thorns and wore wicker helmets, and Wangjuzi Man whose menfolk and womenfolk alike were nimble and good with the lance on horseback.

On 20 January, the defenders led by Cai Xi killed a hundred of the Xunjuan besiegers. The troops of the Jiangxi General took the corpses of the besiegers and broiled them. Five days later, Cai Xi captured, tortured, and killed a group of enemies known as the Puzi Man. A local official named Liang Ke (V. Lương Cảo), who also belonged to the Puzi tribe, recognized their dead bodies by their distinctive helmets and belts unique to each tribe, and subsequently defected.

On 28 January, a naked Buddhist monk, possibly Indian, was wounded in the breast by an arrow shot by Cai Xi while strutting to and fro outside the southern walls. He was carried back to the camp by lots of Man. On 14 February, Cai Xi shot down 200 of the Wangjuzi and over 30 horses using a mounted crossbow from the walls. By 28 February, most of Cai Xi's followers had perished, and he himself had been wounded several times by arrows and stones. The enemy commander, Yang Sijin, penetrated the inner city. Cai Xi tried to escape by boat, but it capsized midstream, drowning him. Fan Chuo escaped east via the Red River. The 400 remaining defenders wanted to flee as well, but could not find any boats, so they chose to make a last stand at the eastern gate. Ambushing a group of enemy cavalry, they killed over 2,000 enemy troops and 300 horses before Yang sent reinforcements from the inner city.

== Aftermath ==
After taking Songping, on 20 June Nanzhao laid siege to Junzhou (modern Haiphong). A Nanzhao and rebel fleet of 4,000 men led by a chieftain named Chu Đạo Cổ (Zhu Daogu, 朱道古) was attacked by a local commander, who rammed their vessels and sank 30 boats, drowning them. In total, the invasion destroyed Tang armies in Annan numbering over 150,000. Although initially welcomed by the local Viets in ousting Tang control, Nanzhao turned on them, ravaging the local population and countryside. Both Chinese and Vietnamese sources note that the Viets fled to the mountains to avoid destruction. A government-in-exile for the protectorate was established in Haimen (near modern-day Hạ Long) with Song Rong in charge. Ten thousand soldiers from Shandong and all other armies of the empire were called and concentrated at Halong Bay for reconquering Annan. A supply fleet of 1,000 ships from Fujian was organized. Nanzhao and its allies launched another siege on Yongzhou (Nanning, Guangxi) in 864, but was repelled.

The Tang launched a counterattack in 864 under Gao Pian, a general who had made his reputation fighting the Türks and the Tanguts in the north. In September 865, Gao's 5,000 troops surprised a Nanzhao army of 50,000 while they were collecting rice from the villages and routed them. Gao captured large quantities of rice, which he used to feed his army. A jealous governor, Li Weizhou, accused Gao of stalling to meet the enemy, and reported him to the throne. The court sent another general named Wang Yanqian to replace Gao. In the meantime, Gao had been reinforced by 7,000 men who arrived overland under the command of Wei Zhongzai. In early 866, Gao's 12,000 men defeated a fresh Nanzhao army and chased them back to the mountains. He then laid siege to Songping but had to leave command due to the arrival of Li Weizhou and Wang Yanqian. He was later reinstated after sending his aid, Zeng Gun, to the capital and he returned with a reinstatement. Gao completed the retaking of Annan in fall 866, executing the enemy general, Duan Qiuqian, and beheading 30,000 of his men.

Nanzhao's 863 victory was so crucial to the Tang that some later Chinese scholars such as Song Qi, co-author of the New Book of Tang, traced the root of the Tang dynasty's collapse to the recruitment of dissatisfied peasant-soldiers to Annan, who later joined the Huang Chao rebellion which decimated the Tang dynasty in the 880s.
