= Phan Bá Vành's Rebellion =

Vietnamese revolt (1825–1827)

| Date | 1825–1827 |
| Location | lower Red River Delta (Hải Dương, Hải Phòng, Thái Bình and Nam Định), Kingdom of Vietnam |
| Result | Rebellion suppressed |

Belligerents
| Anti-government peasant rebels | Vietnamese court |

Commanders and leaders
| Phan Bá Vành (POW); Phan Khánh (executed); Vũ Thị Hinh (executed); Trần Diễn (executed); Vũ Đức Cát (executed) | Minh Mạng; Nguyễn Công Trứ |

Strength
| 5,000–10,000; 100 boats | Several thousand soldiers |

Casualties and losses
| Several thousand deaths 7,000–8,000 arrested | Unknown |
- At least 2,000 families suffered or displaced from fighting and 353 villages in Nam Định were damaged.

Phan Bá Vành's Rebellion (1825–1827), also known as the Peasant Revolt of 1825-1827, was a large revolt of Vietnamese peasants under the leadership of Phan Bá Vành against the court of emperor Minh Mạng in the 1820s. The rebellion spread across Red River Delta, initially crushed government forces, captured numerous cities and towns in the region, and Phan Bá Vành proclaimed himself as king. Outraged, the emperor sent an army to the north, suppressed the revolt and executed Bá Vành in 1827.

== Background and revolt ==
Late eighteenth- and nineteenth-century Vietnamese society had descended into extreme poverty and chaos. At least 105 rebellions occurred during the reign of Gia Long (r. 1802–1819), and 200 occurred during the reign of Minh Mạng (r. 1820–1841). The living conditions of the peasantry in the rural area during these years continued to decrease and plunder down into the lowest point, as inequalities between the landlords and the landless peasants accelerated. According to scholars who have worked on the land registers for Nam Định Province in 1805, village officials and notables frequently owned more land than the average landholder. The government also failed to supply the people's demand when they need, causing widespread disappointing. Many landless peasants who struggled for their daily life like Phan Bá Vành, shifted to become bands of bandits and outlaws. The bandits often pillaged villages, and fought in guerrilla style against the government troops.

Phan Bá Vành originally was a son of a poor fishing family from Làng Cọi (now Vũ Hội Commune, Vũ Thư District, Thái Bình Province). Born and grew up in poverty, Bá Vành's father died early, and he didn't go to school, instead he worked on a rice field and became friends with the neighboring village of Trà Lũ where famous for wrestling. In 1825, at age 19, Bá Vành and his mother were expelled out of the village by his uncle. According to a passage:

"...While he forgot himself in playful combat with the other boys, his water buffaloes ate the paddy of a cruel landowner whom the villagers hated. The landowner cursed Vành, who became angry and killed him. Vành then killed the water buffalo and served its meat, and left the village.”

— Trương Huu Quynh 1972:37

He then became a vagabond, traveled to neighboring Hải Dương Province, mastered martial arts, and joined an outlaw group. Hải Dương was struck by a famine in 1824–1825 that left many peasants suffered in extreme poverty and starvation, where he recruited a large number of men. Later he went to Nam Định, claimed to be king, and launched the revolt against the government.

=== Spreading ===
The rebellion (called bandits by the Hue court) began in Nam Định. Vũ Đức Cát, a former Tayson officer, joined the revolt. He led a rebel fleet of 200 boats attacking the Nam Định citadel in February 1826, murdering the governor of Nam Định Lê Mậu Cúc. News of the revolt gained attention from the court, informing Minh Mạng.

The Emperor ordered Senior General Trương Phúc Đặng of Hanoi to suppress the rebels, forcing the rebels flee east to Quảng Ninh. When the imperial army withdrew, the rebels returned and tried to retake Nam Định, however Đức Cát was arrested by local villagers. Phan Bá Vành now became the most important leader of the rebellion. His rebels pillaged Vũ Tiên and Chân Định districts in Thái Bình Province. The Imperial army once again set out, but was defeated by the rebels in Vũ Tiên. The rebels fought with Chinese pirates (Tàu Ô), then besieged Kiến Xương citadel in late 1826. By early 1827, Phan Bá Vành had already controlled most of the lower delta, and influenced over other provinces.

=== Suppression ===
Outraged by disastrous defeats of the Imperial Army to Vành's rebels, the Emperor ordered the execution of officers and soldiers who had fled the battlefield. In early 1827, he appointed Trương Văn Minh, Nguyễn Công Trứ and Nguyễn Đức Nhuận to accompany the expedition. 1,000 royal guards (linh ve), 100 artillerymen, 300 musketeers, 3 mobile cannons, 30 mountain guns, and 4 elephants from Huế were sent north; combined with 5,000 additional troops from Hanoi, Thanh-Nghệ, Bắc Ninh, Nam Định, Sơn Nam, Hải Dương Provinces, all were to suppress the rebellion. The heads of Phan Bá Vành and his comrade Nguyễn Hạnh were awarded for 330 pounds of silver as trophy.

In late 1826, the rebels repulsed a government attack at the Cổ Trai river, 80 Imperial soldiers were killed during night-time. In early 1827, government forces opened fire at 5,000 rebels in Kiến Xương, forcing them to flee. In February, Vành divided his forces to blockade both river and land routes in Thư Trì District in Nam Định. However the royal fleet under Phạm Văn Lý defeated Vành at the Bồng Điền River. The rebels were routed, and 2,000 of them included Vành fled to the Trà Lũ commune, then built moat ramparts around Trà Lũ, tried to hold off Trà Lũ as their resistance fortress.

=== Siege of Trà Lũ ===
By mid-March, the Imperial army had already been surrounding the rebels in Trà Lũ. They brought 17 cannons and constantly bombarded the defenders days by days while the rebels died off due to starvation and artillery fires. In late March, government troops rushed into the fortress, captured Phan Bá Vành and 760 followers while killing 160 rebels. Phan Bá Vành soon died due to wounds, his head was cut off, his body was sliced into pieces and displayed in public. 400 captives were shipped to Hanoi, where they were sentenced to death by the Emperor.

The Trà Lũ village was completely destroyed, seven to eight thousand people were arrested, including several hundred women. Houses, buildings, trees, and bamboo were burned to the ground. The rebellion was annihilated by April 1827.

== Notes ==
Footnote

Citations
