= Lê Cung Hoàng =

Lê Cung Hoàng 黎恭皇
- Emperor of Đại Việt

Emperor of the Later Lê Dynasty
- Reign: 1522–1527
- Predecessor: Lê Chiêu Tông
- Successor: Lê Trang Tông
- Born: 26 July 1507
- Died: 15 June 1527 (aged 19)
Names
- Lê Xuân (黎椿)
Era name and dates
- Thống Nguyên (統元): 1522–1527
Posthumous name
- Cung hoàng đế (恭皇帝)
- House: Lê Dynasty
- Father: Lê Sùng
- Mother: Trịnh Thị Loan

Lê Cung Hoàng (黎恭皇, 26 July 1507 – 15 June 1527), born Lê Xuân, was the last emperor of the Later Lê dynasty of Vietnam and reigned from 1522 to 1527.

== Biography ==
Lê Cung Hoàng was put on the throne by the powerful general Mạc Đăng Dung in 1522 in place of the deposed emperor, Lê Chiêu Tông. Eventually Mạc Đăng Dung deposed Lê Cung Hoàng in 1527, thus establishing the Mạc dynasty.

Preceded by Lê Chiêu Tông	Emperor of Vietnam; 1522–1527	Succeeded by Lê Trang Tông
