= Chu Đạo Cổ =

Chu Đạo Cổ (chữ Hán: 朱道古; ? - 866), known in Chinese as Zhu Daogu (Wade–Giles: Chu Tao-ku) was a chieftain who allied with Nanzhao's generals Yang Sijin and Duan Qiuqian in the assault on the Tang-held city of Songping (modern-day Hanoi), capital of the Tang's Protectorate General to Pacify the South (modern-day northern Vietnam) in early 863. After captured Songping, in June 863, Zhu Daogu commanded a local army of 2,000 men, with other 4,000 Yunnanese men and together rowing several hundred small boats, attacked the Tang stronghold of Chün-zhou (modern-day Haiphong). Zhu Daogu captured a Tang officer, but a commander from the headquarters of the governor-general counterattacked. The Tang dynasty took ten large sailing junks and war boats, and rammed the rebels' fleets and sank 30 boats. Three years later, in December 866 the Tang general Gao Pian recaptured Annan and had Zhu Daogu executed, along with other local rebel leaders.

== Bibliography ==
- Kiernan, Ben (2019). Việt Nam: a history from earliest time to the present. Oxford University Press.
- Wang, Zhenping (2013), Tang China in Multi-Polar Asia: A History of Diplomacy and War, University of Hawaii Press, ISBN 978-0-520-01145-8
- Schafer, Edward Hetzel (1967), The Vermilion Bird: T'ang Images of the South, Los Angeles: University of California Press, ISBN 978-0-520-01145-8
- Taylor, Keith Weller (1983), The Birth of the Vietnam, University of California Press
