= Trịnh Duy Sản =

Military general of Đại Việt in the late Lê Sơ dynasty

Trịnh Duy Sản (chữ Hán: 鄭惟㦃; ? – 1516), was a later Lê-period politician, a military general of Đại Việt in the late Lê Sơ dynasty. He was considered a rebel, his story was recorded in the Renegade Story because of his regicide against the Emperor of that time, Lê Tương Dực. The division of warlords and chaos at the end of the Lê Sơ Dynasty was also initiated by him.

== Biography ==
Trinh Duy Sản was from Thủy Chú village, Xuân Thắng commune, Thọ Xuân district, Thanh Hóa, Vietnam. He was the grandson of Dương Vũ, the Duke of Ngọc district, Trịnh Khắc Phục, the founding father of the Later Le dynasty and a maternal relative of Lê Tương Dực. Trịnh Khắc Phục had eight sons: Trịnh Bá Nhai, Trịnh Trọng Ngạn, Trịnh Trọng Phong, Trịnh Thúc Thông, Trịnh Thúc Tùng, Trịnh Đại Hưng, Trịnh Như Sơn and Trịnh Quý Nham. Of these, Trịnh Trọng Ngạn had three sons: Trịnh Duy Thuận, Trinh Duy Đại and Trinh Duy Sản.

Trịnh Trọng Phong was the father of Trịnh Thị Tuyên, the first wife of Kiến Vương Lê Tân and the biological mother of Tương Dực Đế, who was murdered by Lê Uy Mục in 1509. In terms of seniority, Trịnh Duy Sản was the cousin of Madame Trịnh and the uncle of Tương Dực Đế.

== Suppressing Trần Tuân's Rebellion ==
Trịnh Duy Sản sided with Lê Tương Dực in the coup that overthrew Lê Uy Mục in 1509 and was given the title of Mỹ Huệ Marquis (美惠侯).

In 1511, Trần Tuân in Sơn Tây gathered the militia and rebelled. Lê Tương Dực ordered Mỹ Huệ Marquis Trịnh Duy Sản to lead troops to attack Trần Tuân. Duy Sản was defeated, with only 30 men left, and retreated to Đông Ngạc, Nhật Chiêu. Tuân's army was powerful, wanting to seize the capital. Nghĩa Quốc Công Nguyễn Văn Lang ordered the 6 Điện Tiền guards to pull the Tiểu Thiên Quang boat down the river, intending to bring the emperor to Thanh Hóa, hold the dangerous place, then call all the workers from the offices of the Ministry of Public Works and the workers of the regular government, and arrange the cavalry in Dong Ha to guard. At night, they were all scared and fled back. Tương Dực ordered Minh Luân Bá Lê Niệm, Chief Eunuch Lê Văn Huy and 2 people from the Department of Literature to bring the strongmen from the two offices of Hải Thanh and Hà Thanh to row two light boats to Từ Liêm to investigate the situation of the enemy troops.

After being defeated, Trịnh Duy Sản gathered the remaining troops, swore with his soldiers to fight the enemy together, tore their shirts as a sign, and then took advantage of the evening to split up and sneak into Tuân's camp. Tuân had just defeated the imperial army, so he was complacent and unprepared. Duy Sản and 30 men raided straight into the camp, went to where Tran Tuan was sitting, and stabbed Tran Tuan to death. After killing Tuân, Trịnh Duy Sản ordered his troops to fire three cannons as a signal, and Nguyễn Văn Lang's reinforcements rushed forward to attack and kill. Trần Tuân's army was defeated.

Having made the first contribution, Trịnh Duy Sản was appointed as Duke of Nguyên (原郡公) and assigned to guard the Imperial Guard.

== Fight East and North ==
In 1512, Lê Hy, Trịnh Hưng and Lê Minh Triệt rebelled in Nghệ An. Tương Dực sent Khang Quận Công Trần Nghi and Đông Các Hiệu Thư Trần Dực to fight. When they entered Nghệ An, Nghi's men in front and behind were attacked by the enemy. The army crossed the sea, the boat was broken by the waves, and the whole army drowned. Nghi and Duc also drowned at sea. Hy and Hưng advanced to Lôi Dương. Trinh Duy San commanded the army, beheaded Lê Minh Triệt and brought him back to the capital to be displayed in Đông Tân ward; Hy and Hưng were captured alive, put in a cage, brought back to the capital and killed.

In 1515, Phùng Cương revolted in the Tam Đảo mountain area, and the Duke of Nguyên Trịnh Duy Sản received orders to fight and suppress it.

The Nguyễn and Trịnh officials both had great contributions to the court, so they became jealous of each other. Trịnh Duy Sản had conflicts with Nguyễn Văn Lang. After Văn Lang died, he became even more arrogant and relied on his power in the court.

== A servant-turned-king in the time of anarchy ==
=== Killing Lê Tương Dực ===
After many years of ruling, Lê Tương Dực began to indulge in wine and women, built the majestic Cửu Trùng Đài, and called it the Hundred-Roof Palace, with a grand scale. Duy Sản repeatedly disobeyed his will and was beaten with a whip. He was angry and secretly discussed with Grand Tutor Lê Quảng Độ and Trịnh Trí Sâm about plotting a rebellion.

In 1516, Trần Cảo raised troops to attack Bắc Giang. Cảo became the strongest rebel force at that time and proclaimed himself Emperor. Duy San and the generals prepared boats and weapons at Thái Cực wharf, saying that they were going to attack Trần Cảo.

On April 6 of that year, at the second watch, Duy Sản led more than 3,000 soldiers to guard the North Gate. Le Tương Dực heard the news and thought that Trần Cảo's army was coming, so he went out of Bảo Khánh Gate, went to Cầu Dừa and then turned back to the South Gate of the citadel. Arriving at Chu Tước Lake, Tương Dực met Duy Sản and asked: "Which side is the enemy?". Duy Sản did not answer, turned away, and laughed out loud. Tương Dực Emperor was suspicious, turned his horse and fled to the west. Duy Sản ordered his warriors to hold spears to stop the king, then ordered his warrior Hạnh to stab Tương Dực to the ground and kill him. After that, he ordered his soldiers to bring Tương Dực's body back to Bắc Sứ Inn and burn it with fire.

=== Dead in Suppression ===
After killing Tương Dực Đế, Trịnh Duy Sản and his ministers enthroned Lê Y, the great-grandson of Lê Thánh Tông, as Lê Chiêu Tông.

The Trần Cảo rebel army captured the capital city of Đông Kinh, and the Le dynasty court fled. Duy Sản, in the name of King Chiêu Tông, commanded both the navy and the army, joining forces with the generals to attack the capital, besieging it on all four sides. Duy Sản changed the direction of attack from Thái Cực wharf to Đông Hà wharf. Trần Cảo's army was shaken, but the Lê army had not yet recaptured Đông Kinh, so they switched to besieging the west.

While the battle for the capital was undecided, a general in Sơn Tây, Hà Công Chân, wanted to take credit for taking the capital and fight against the imperial army. Trịnh Duy Sản personally led his army to block the attack and killed Công Chân. Afterwards, the Lê army joined forces to defeat Trần Cảo's army. Cao broke the siege and fled. Chiêu Tông returned to the capital and officially ascended the throne.

In August 1516, Trịnh Duy Sản took control of the naval and land forces and managed the districts in Hải Dương. In November of that year, Duy Sản and An Hòa Marquis Nguyễn Hoằng Dụ (son of Nguyễn Văn Lang) led the generals to fight Tran Cao in Trau Son commune, Chí Linh district (Hải Dương). Seeing that the soldiers had been fighting for a long time but had not yet defeated the enemy, he wrote a proclamation to stir up the soldiers' spirits. The proclamation was written in Chinese characters and was translated into Nôm script so everyone could understand it; the words were very touching.

However, the situation in the capital was not peaceful, and the discipline of the soldiers was not strict. The generals relied on their achievements to act recklessly, ransacked the capital, and killed people freely. When Duy Sản heard the news, he quickly ordered his adopted son Trần Chân, who was also a talented general, to send some troops back to the capital to suppress the rebellious generals.

After that, Duy Sản's army fought hand-to-hand with Trần Cảo's army, and his general Hạnh died in battle. The situation was critical. Trần Cảo's army came to challenge him, Trịnh Duy Sản wanted to go out, the generals tried to stop him, but he did not listen; he personally went to the vanguard to attack the enemy camp. Trần Cảo set up an ambush and defeated the court army. Trịnh Duy Sản and Nguyễn Thượng were captured alive by Trần Cảo and brought back to the headquarters in Vạn Kiếp to be killed.

== Comment ==
Trịnh Duy Sản was recorded in the book Đại Việt Comprehensive History in Renergade Tales, and can be considered the person who started the great chaos in the early Lê Dynasty. Objectively looking at the surface, Trịnh Duy Sản was initially a meritorious official of the Lê Dynasty, with the merit of suppressing the rebels. When Lê Tương Dực was debauched and committed many immoral acts, he dissuaded the emperor. Those actions can be considered disloyal.

Before Duy Sản killed Lê Tương Dực, the court only had to deal with external uprisings, and rebellions only took place among members of the royal family. After Duy Sản's act of killing the emperor, from the time of Lê Chiêu Tông, the world was in chaos, the mandarins each had their own agenda, divided into factions to fight and kill each other, and the emperors became puppets in their hands.

Had Trịnh Duy Sản not perished under Trần Cảo's hands, he would have continued to be the one in charge of politics. But Duy Sản's death showed that he was not a person with enough talent to pacify the world like Mạc Đăng Dung later. Mạc Đăng Dung emerged when the situation was more chaotic than when Trịnh Duy Sản was in power. After his death, his subordinates such as Trần Chân and Nguyễn Kính were all famous generals of the time, shaking the world.

== See also ==
- Hậu Lê Dynasty
- Lê Uy Mục
- Lê Tương Dực
- Lê Chiêu Tông
- Trần Chân
- Trần Cảo

== Sources ==
- Complete Annals of Đại Việt
- Đại Việt Comprehensive History
- Complete History of Vietnam – Phạm Văn Sơn
