= Tây Vu Vương =

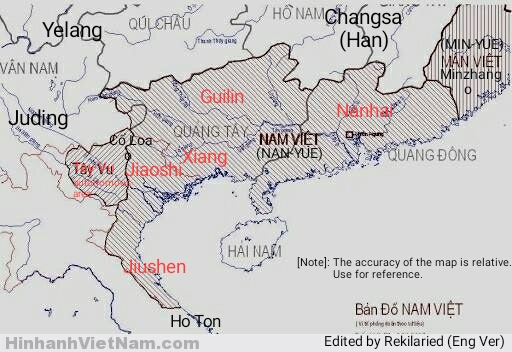
Map showing the location of Tây Vu autonomous area (its centre is Cổ Loa).

Tây Vu Vương (chữ Hán: 西于王, Chinese: 西于王), or the "King of Tây Vu" (fl. 111 BC), is the title attributed by some Vietnamese historians to the leader of a popular revolt in the Jiaozhi and Jiuzhen commanderies against the rule of the Chinese Western Han dynasty.

Tây Vu Vương was the leader of the Tây Vu autonomous area of which the centre was Cổ Loa. Some historians consider that he was probably a descendant of An Dương Vương. Historian Trần Quốc Vượng saw the king as having established a fief or government at Cổ Loa. At the end of Han conquest of Nanyue, he was killed by his assistant Huang Tong (黄同; Hoàng Đồng).

== See also ==
- Lạc Việt
- Han conquest of Nanyue
