= Lê Duy Mật =

- Born: 1738
- Died: 1767 (aged 28–29)
- Occupation: Rebel leader
- Children: 1; Trịnh Sâm

Lê Duy Mật (chữ Hán: 黎維, 1738–1767) was a Vietnamese rebel leader who was active in the 18th century.

Mật was a son of Emperor Lê Dụ Tông. In 1738, he planned a plot against the Trịnh lord together with two princes, his brother Lê Duy Quý and Lê Duy Chúc (son of Lê Hy Tông), but failed. They had to flee, and hid somewhere in Thanh Hóa.

In 1740, Mật launched a rebellion against the Trịnh lords in Thanh Hóa. He attacked Hưng Hóa and Sơn Tây. He was defeated by the Trịnh army, retreated to Nghệ An, then to Muang Phuan, and occupied Trình Quang Mountain as his base area. In 1764, he sought aid from Nguyễn Phúc Khoát, but was refused because the Nguyễn lords did not want to engage in conflict with the Trịnh lords.

In 1767, Trịnh Doanh died, and his son Trịnh Sâm succeeded him as the head of the Trinh lords. Hearing the news, Mật attacked Thanh Chương and Hương Sơn, but was defeated. In 1769, he was defeated by the Trịnh army. He set fire to the fort and committed suicide.

== See also ==
- Nguyễn Hữu Cầu
- Nguyễn Danh Phương
- Hoàng Công Chất
