= Nguyễn Hữu Cầu =

- Born: 1712; Lôi Động
- Died: March 1751 (aged 38–39)
- Other name: Quận He
- Occupation: Leader

Nguyễn Hữu Cầu (chữ Hán: 阮有求, 1712–1751) was the leader of a rebellion of Tonkin peasantry in the 18th century.

== Biography ==
Nguyễn Hữu Cầu was born in a poor family in Lôi Động (Tân An, Thanh Hà, Hải Dương, Việt Nam now). He was very good at martial art and swimming. Because of being poor, he was a robber. After that, he followed a revolution led by Nguyễn Cừ and became a talented general. He was called Quận He.

The revolution came from Đồ Sơn (Hải Phòng), moved to Kinh Bac, Đông Kinh then Son Nam, Thanh Hoa, Nghe An. When Nguyễn Cừ, the leader of the revolution, was arrested, Nguyễn Hữu Cầu led the army to Đồ Sơn and Vân Đồn.

He was captured by Phạm Đình Trọng, and executed in Thang Long in March 1751.

== See also ==
- Hoàng Công Chất
- Nguyễn Danh Phương
- Lê Duy Mật
