= Nguyễn Danh Phương =

- Died: March 1751
- Other name: Quận Hẻo
- Occupation: Rebel leader

Nguyễn Danh Phương (chữ Hán: 阮名芳, ?–1751) was a Vietnamese rebel leader who was active in the 18th century.

He was born in Yên Lạc, Sơn Tây (a part of modern Vĩnh Yên, Vĩnh Phúc Province). He rebelled against Trịnh lord in 1740, and occupied Tam Đảo Mountain. Local people called him Quận Hẻo. Later, he occupied Ngọc Bội Mountain, titled himself Thuận Thiên Khải Vận Đại Nhân (順天啓運大人), and started to collect taxes in Tuyên Quang.

He was defeated and captured by Trịnh Doanh in 1751. In the same year, he was executed in Thang Long together with Nguyễn Hữu Cầu.

== See also ==
- Nguyễn Hữu Cầu
- Hoàng Công Chất
- Lê Duy Mật
