= Phan Bá Vành =

Phan Bá Vành (潘伯鑅, died March 12, 1827), a native of Minh Giám village (now Vũ Tiên, Thái Bình Province in coastal northern Vietnam), was a prominent Vietnamese rebel leader who spearheaded one of the most significant peasant uprisings during the early Nguyễn dynasty. He led a large-scale revolt known as the Phan Bá Vành Rebellion against the rule of Emperor Minh Mạng, the second emperor of the dynasty.

== Early life ==
Phan Bá Vành was born in Minh Giám village, located in what is now Vũ Tiên District, Thái Bình Province, in the Red River Delta region of northern Vietnam. Not much is known about his early life, but he is believed to have come from a peasant background, a factor that shaped his later role as a leader of agrarian resistance.

== The Rebellion ==
The Phan Bá Vành Rebellion erupted in the early 1820s, driven by widespread discontent among peasants due to oppressive taxation, forced labor, and centralization policies enacted by Emperor Minh Mạng. The emperor's Confucian-driven reforms aimed to consolidate imperial authority, but they often disregarded local traditions and autonomy, stirring resentment in rural areas.

Bá Vành emerged as a charismatic and strategic leader, organizing a formidable insurgency that, at its height, comprised dozens of local commanders and spread across multiple provinces in northern Vietnam. His forces established semi-autonomous zones and disrupted imperial supply routes, threatening regional stability.

According to historical sources, his army at one point included 24 commanders, each operating semi-independently under a broader coordinated resistance. The rebels were primarily drawn from the peasantry and possibly included former soldiers, disillusioned officials, and others marginalized by the Nguyễn administration.

== Suppression and Death ==
The rebellion persisted for six years, posing one of the most serious threats to the Nguyễn regime during the early 19th century. Despite his initial successes, Phan Bá Vành's movement gradually lost momentum due to sustained military pressure from imperial forces, internal fragmentation, and logistical difficulties.

Phan Bá Vành is believed to have died in battle on March 12, 1827, during a decisive confrontation with government troops. His death marked the collapse of the rebellion, allowing the Nguyễn court to reassert control over the affected regions.

== Legacy ==
Although ultimately unsuccessful, the Phan Bá Vành Rebellion has been remembered as a symbol of rural resistance against authoritarian centralization. It underscored the volatility of early Nguyễn rule and highlighted the deep divisions between the imperial center and the rural periphery.

In modern Vietnamese historiography, Phan Bá Vành is often portrayed as a folk hero and a representative of grassroots opposition to feudal oppression.
