= Từ Liêm =

Từ Liêm Ward Phường Từ Liêm
- Ward (Class-II)
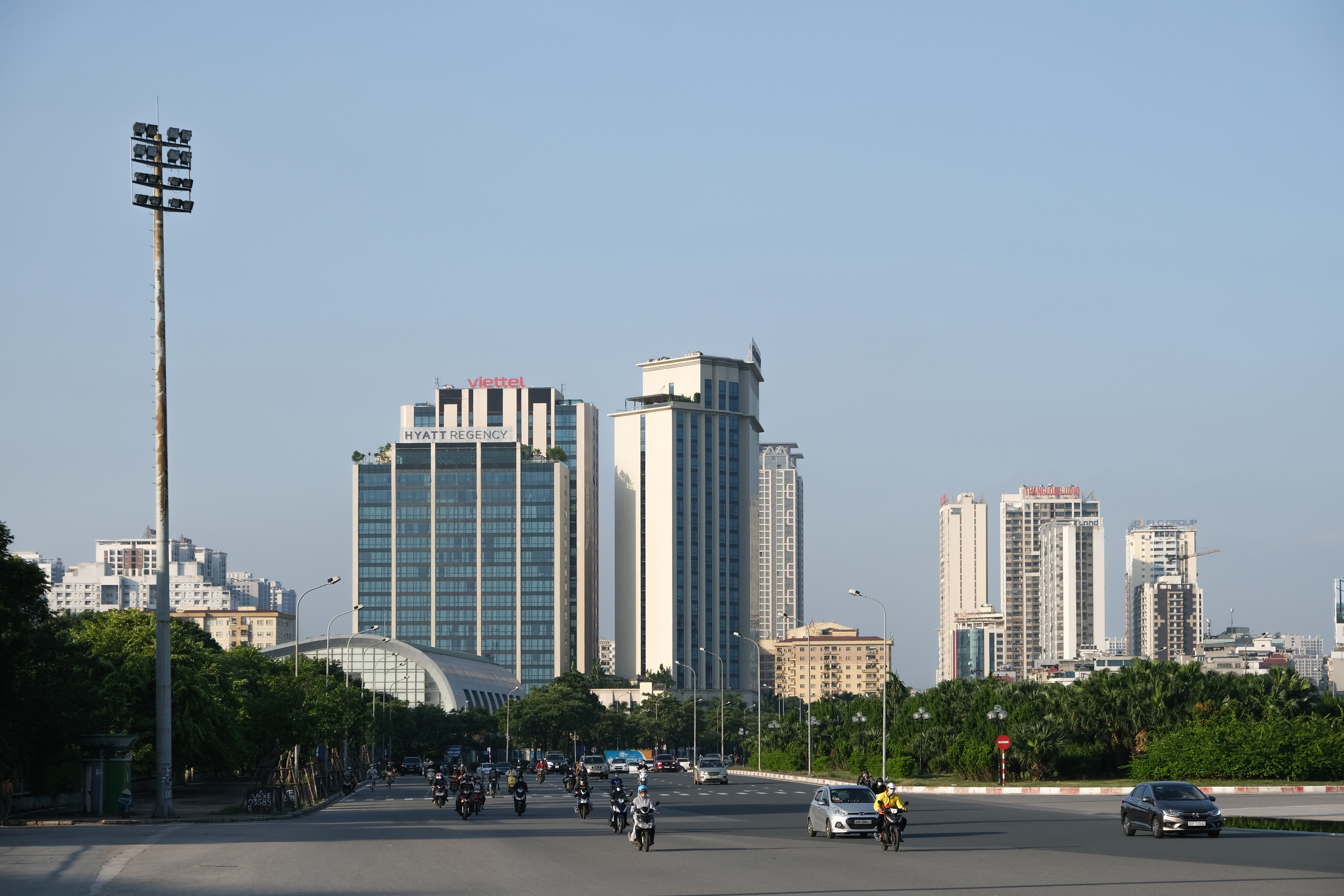
- View of Hyatt Regency West Hanoi Hotel.
- Nickname: "The Racing Round" (Đường Đua)
- Interactive map of Từ Liêm Ward
- Location within Vietnam
- Coordinates: 21°02′20″N 105°45′58″E
- Country: Vietnam
- Region: Red River Delta
- Municipality: Hà Nội
- Establishment: 621–AD (district); May 31, 1961 (rural district); December 27, 2013 (urban district); April 23, 2025 (ward)
- Central hall: No.125, Hồ Tùng Mậu road, Từ Liêm ward, Hà Nội city

Government
  - Type: Ward-level authority
  - People Committee's Chairman: Mai Trọng Thái
  - People Council's chairman: Lâm Quang Thao
  - Front Committee's chairman: Đỗ Thiện Đức
  - Party Committee's Secretary: Nguyễn Quang Hiếu

Area
  - Total: 32.17 km^{2} (12.42 sq mi)

Population (2025)
  - Total: 269,076
  - Density: 8,364/km^{2} (21,660/sq mi)
  - Ethnicities: Kinh; Tanka; Others
- Time zone: UTC+7 (Indochina Time)
- ZIP code: 10000–12000 (Note: An official code from December 31, 2024, to present.)
- Climate: Cwa
- Website: Tuliem.Hanoi.gov.vn; Tuliem.Hanoi.dcs.vn

Từ Liêm [tɨ̤˨˩:liəm˧˧] is a ward of Hà Nội the capital city in the Red River Delta of Vietnam.

== History ==
=== Middle Ages ===
The site of Từ Liêm Ward was once the administrative center of Từ Liêm Rural District (慈廉縣, Từ Liêm huyện), which was established by the Đường dynasty in 621 as a suburb area of Đại La citadel. The reason for this name is because, according to Tang Book, this place used to be located next to a small river, (Note: By ideas of researchers Tạ Chí Đại Trường and Nguyễn Hùng Vỹ, words "cửu-diên", "cửu-liên", "mạc-liên", "từ-liêm" and "tứ-liên" are the Hanese ways of the phonetic for "k'len", "t'len" or "sen" (originated from Sanskrit "kamala" कमल) in ancient Annamese language, which mean "lotus [bund]".) which has now been filled in during the expansion of Hà Nội city from the early 20th century. The last remaining vestiges of that river are three landmarks : Kẻ Chèm, (Note: Sometimes as "Trèm".) Kẻ Vẽ and Trích Sài.

When the Lý dynasty began building Thăng Long the capital citadel, the modern location of Từ Liêm naturally became its western gate (Note: Philippe Papin, Histoire de Hanoï / Lịch-sử Hà-nội (en français et vietnamien), Thế Giới Publishing House, Hanoi, Vietnam, 2020.) until the Tây Sơn dynasty was destroyed.

Location and name of Từ Liêm District in the administrative map of the French Tonkin.

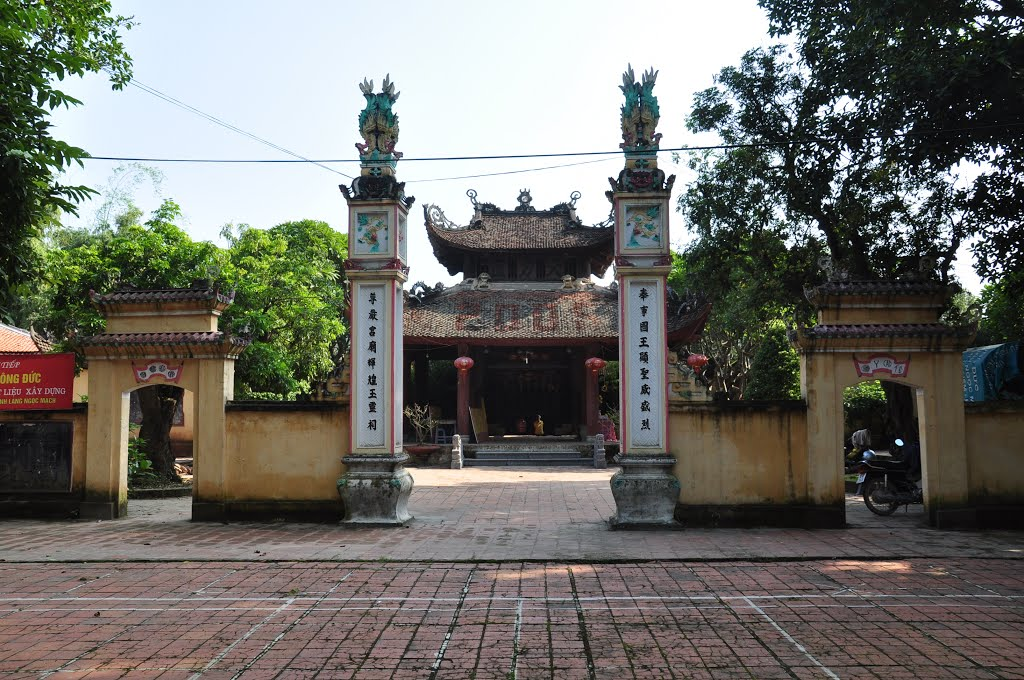
Ngọc Mạch communal hall

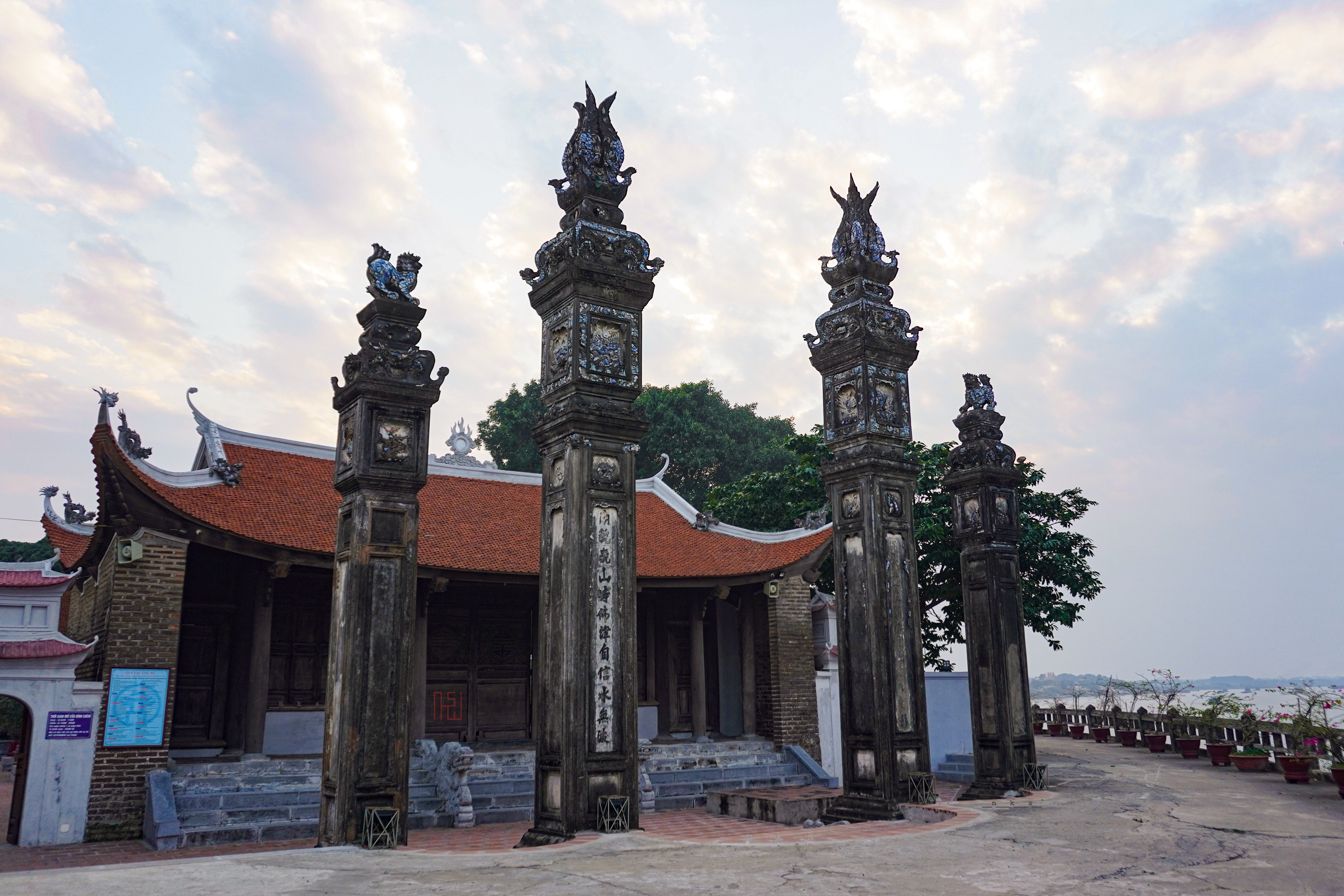
Kẻ Chèm communal hall

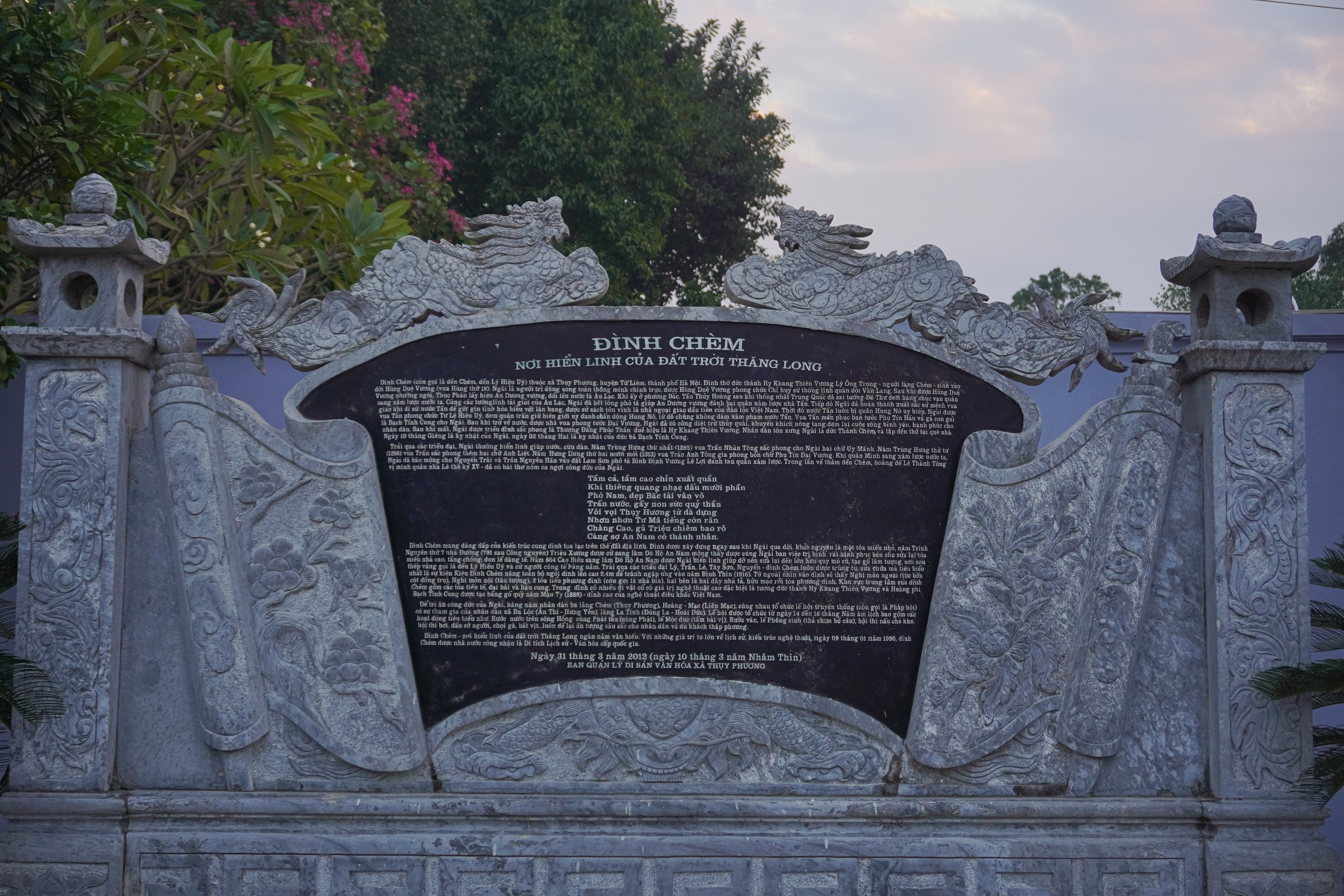
Latin stele of Kẻ Chèm communal hall

=== 20th century ===
Từ Liêm Rural District has changed into Từ Liêm District (慈廉郡, quận Từ Liêm) belonging to Hà Đông province by the State of Vietnam regime from 1948 to 1954.

On May 31, 1961, Từ Liêm Rural District has been transferred to Hà Nội city by the Government of the Democratic Republic of Vietnam.

=== 21st century ===
On December 27, 2013, Từ Liêm Rural District was continued to divided into two urban districts Bắc Từ Liêm and Nam Từ Liêm, still belonging to Hanoi.

On April 23, 2025, the Nam Từ Liêm Urban-District People's Council, term III from 2021 to 2026, held the 23rd session to pass a Resolution (Note: Nghị quyết về tán thành chủ trương thực hiện phương án sắp xếp đơn vị hành chính các phường trên địa bàn.) for approving the policy of implementing the plan to re-arrange ward-level administrative units in its whole area. Accordingly, parallel with the dissolution of Nam Từ Liêm Urban District is the establishment of 4 new ward-level administrative units : Đại Mỗ, Tây Mỗ, Từ Liêm, Xuân Phương.

Basic administrative unit named Từ Liêm Ward (慈廉坊, phường Từ Liêm) includes the entire area and population of former Cầu Diễn ward, most of the same ones of four former wards Mễ Trì, Mỹ Đình 1, Mỹ Đình 2, Phú Đô from former Nam Từ Liêm Urban District and part of the same ones of former Mai Dịch ward from Cầu Giấy Urban District. Its name was restored after a period of being shared by two former urban districts to honor the cultural and historical values of the middle-age village-level administrative unit, which had existed for many centuries.

== See also ==
- Cầu Giấy
- Đông Ngạc
- Nghĩa Đô
- Phú Thượng
- Yên Hòa
