= Lê Tương Dực =

Lê Tương Dực 黎襄翼
- Emperor of Đại Việt

Emperor of the Lê dynasty
- Reign: 1509–1516
- Predecessor: Lê Uy Mục
- Successor: Lê Chiêu Tông
- Born: 16 July 1495
- Died: 8 May 1516 (aged 20)
Names
- Lê Oanh (黎瀠)
Era name and dates
- Hồng Thuận (洪順): 1509–1516
Posthumous name
- Linh Ẩn Vương (靈隱王), later Tương Dực Hoàng Đế (襄翼皇帝)
- House: Lê dynasty
- Father: Lê Tân
- Mother: Trịnh Thị Tuyên

Lê Tương Dực (Han: 黎襄翼; 16 July 1495 – 8 May 1516), birth name Lê Oanh (黎瀠), reigned from 1509 to 1516, was the ninth emperor of the later Lê dynasty of Đại Việt. The only primary account of his life and reign was the Đại Việt sử ký toàn thư, the official historical chronicle of Đại Việt during the Lê dynasty which was completed in 1697 under the direction of the Trịnh lords. The chronicle described Lê Tương Dực as initially being a good emperor who reorganized the court and ruled the nation wisely. However, later during his reign, he became overly greedy, corrupt and extravagant.

He was a grandson of Lê Thánh Tông and the second son of Prince Lê Tân, a younger brother of Lê Hiến Tông. His mother was Trịnh Thị Tuyên, a daughter of general Trịnh Trọng Phong. In 1509, Hiến Tông's son, Emperor Lê Uy Mục arrested Lê Oanh during a program of purging imperial princes who were suspicious of disloyalty. Oanh fled to Thanh Hoá, the House of Lê's homeland, and gathered an army against the Emperor. With the help of his lieutenants Nguyễn Văn Lang and Nguyễn Hoằng Dụ, Oanh marched his army to the imperial capital and defeated the Emperor's military officers. In retaliation, Lê Uy Mục executed Oanh's elder brother, Lê Sùng. That did not prevent Oanh from decisively routing the Emperor's main army and killing Uy Mục. Oanh then proclaimed himself Emperor and designed his era name as Hồng Thuận (洪順). In the early years of his reign, Lê Oanh, known to later generations as Lê Tương Dực, had some achievements in reorganizing the government and fostering Neo-Confucianist education. He also ordered the compilation of a new historical chronicle, Đại Việt thông giám thông khảo, by the Minister of War Vũ Quỳnh and Trị bình bảo phạm or "Rules for Maintaining Social Stability", in accordance with Neo-Confucianism.

However, later in his reign, he spent extravagantly in building many colossal palaces in the capital Thăng Long. The most notable of those places was one known to the Vietnamese as "Nine-Story Tower" (Cửu Trùng Đài), designed by famous architect Vũ Như Tô. He also spent much time enjoying sexual activities with his concubines, many of whom were former concubines of Lê Hiến Tông and Lê Uy Mục. According to court chronicles, he ordered special ships to be built for him to travel on the West Lake. He also forced his concubines to strip naked and perform elegant [sic] dances on these ships. As the result of the emperor's luxurious lifestyle and ignorance of state affairs, the people suffered considerable hardships. Many soldiers committed to build imperial palaces died due to diseases. As the government became increasingly unpopular, many rebellions broke out. The largest of them was that of Trần Cảo, a northerner who claimed to be an heir of the House of Trần.

Because of his terrible leadership, he was known as the "Pig Emperor" (Trư Vương, 豬王) by later historians. The name comes from the remarks of him by a Chinese diplomat who came to Đại Việt in 1513.

In 1516, a group of imperial guards, led by general Trịnh Duy Sản, murdered Lê Tương Dực in the capital.

Preceded by Lê Uy Mục	Emperor of Vietnam; 1509–1516	Succeeded by Lê Chiêu Tông
