= Trần Cao =

Trần Cảo (陳暠, d. after 1525) or Trần Cao (陳高), was an early 16th-century Vietnamese rebel leader. Cảo born in Dưỡng Chân, Thuỷ Đường (present day Thuỷ Nguyên, Hải Phòng).

== Early life ==
Details of Cảo's early life are unknown except that he was a low-ranking mandarin of Lê Dynasty and he claimed himself the descendant of emperor Trần Thái Tông of Trần Dynasty and related with mother of Trần Thánh Tông, empress Quang Thục.

== Rebellion ==
In March 1516, Cảo proclaimed himself "Đế Thích giáng trần" ("incarnation of Śakra") and recruited fighters at Quynh Lam Temple in Đông Triều, a religious site reputed to have miraculous powers. After shaving their heads, he marched them unopposed, ten thousand strong, through the Kinh Bac districts of Que Duong and Tiên Du down to the plains of Gia Lâm to Từ Liêm in Sơn Tây Province. In May 1516, Cảo's force captured Thăng Long and forced emperor Lê Chiêu Tông flee to Tay Do. Thereafter, the Lê loyalists attacked and recaptured Thăng Long and made Cảo retreat back to his Hai Duong-Kinh Bac border stronghold. Then, a long war was resulted between the Lê loyalists and Cảo's rebels.

Before 1525, the year of Trần Cảo rebellion's ultimate defeat, Cảo unexpectedly gave his commanding post to his son, Tran Cung (or Tran Thang), and then became a monk. From this point on, no further information was recorded about Trần Cảo.
