= Lê Chiêu Tông =

Emperor of Đại Việt (r. 1516–1522)

Lê Chiêu Tông 黎昭宗
- Emperor of Đại Việt

Emperor of the Lê dynasty
- Reign: 1516–1522
- Predecessor: Lê Tương Dực
- Successor: Lê Cung Hoàng

Retired emperor of the Lê dynasty
- Reign: 1522–1526
- Born: 4 October 1506
- Died: 18 December 1526 (aged 20)
Names
- Lê Y (黎椅)
Era name and dates
- Quang Thiệu (光紹): 1516–1522
Posthumous name
- Thần Hoàng đế (神皇帝)
Temple name
- Chiêu Tông (昭宗)
- House: Lê dynasty
- Father: Lê Sùng
- Mother: Trịnh Thị Loan

Lê Chiêu Tông (黎昭宗, 4 October 1506 – 18 December 1526; also called Lê Y, 黎椅 or 黎譓) was an emperor of the Lê dynasty of Vietnam who ruled from 1516 to 1526. He was the son of Lê Sùng and nephew of the preceding king Lê Tuong Duc. As Lê Tuong Duc was assassinated in 1516, the young Lê Chieu Tông was put on the throne. His short reign was heavily colored by continuing factionalism and jockeying for power between the Mạc and Nguyen families, and his own.

In 1524, Le had been forced by a rebellion to flee the capital; this rebellion was quashed by General Mạc Đăng Dung, who took the opportunity to seize power for himself. Lê Chieu Tông was killed by Mạc supporters shortly afterwards, and succeeded by his brother, Lê Cung Hoàng.

| Preceded by Lê Tương Dực | Emperor of Vietnam; 1516–1524 | Succeeded by Lê Cung Hoàng |
