= 1594 =

1594 in various calendars
- Gregorian calendar: 1594; MDXCIV
- Ab urbe condita: 2347
- Armenian calendar: 1043; ԹՎ ՌԽԳ
- Assyrian calendar: 6344
- Balinese saka calendar: 1515–1516
- Bengali calendar: 1000–1001
- Berber calendar: 2544
- English Regnal year: 36 Eliz. 1 – 37 Eliz. 1
- Buddhist calendar: 2138
- Burmese calendar: 956
- Byzantine calendar: 7102–7103
- Chinese calendar: 癸巳年 (Water Snake); 4291 or 4084 — to — 甲午年 (Wood Horse); 4292 or 4085
- Coptic calendar: 1310–1311
- Discordian calendar: 2760
- Ethiopian calendar: 1586–1587
- Hebrew calendar: 5354–5355
- Hindu calendars
- Vikram Samvat: 1650–1651
- Shaka Samvat: 1515–1516
- Kali Yuga: 4694–4695
- Holocene calendar: 11594
- Igbo calendar: 594–595
- Iranian calendar: 972–973
- Islamic calendar: 1002–1003
- Japanese calendar: Bunroku 3 (文禄３年)
- Javanese calendar: 1514–1515
- Julian calendar: Gregorian minus 10 days
- Korean calendar: 3927
- Minguo calendar: 318 before ROC 民前318年
- Nanakshahi calendar: 126
- Thai solar calendar: 2136–2137
- Tibetan calendar: ཆུ་མོ་སྦྲུལ་ལོ་ (female Water-Snake); 1720 or 1339 or 567 — to — ཤིང་ཕོ་རྟ་ལོ་ (male Wood-Horse); 1721 or 1340 or 568

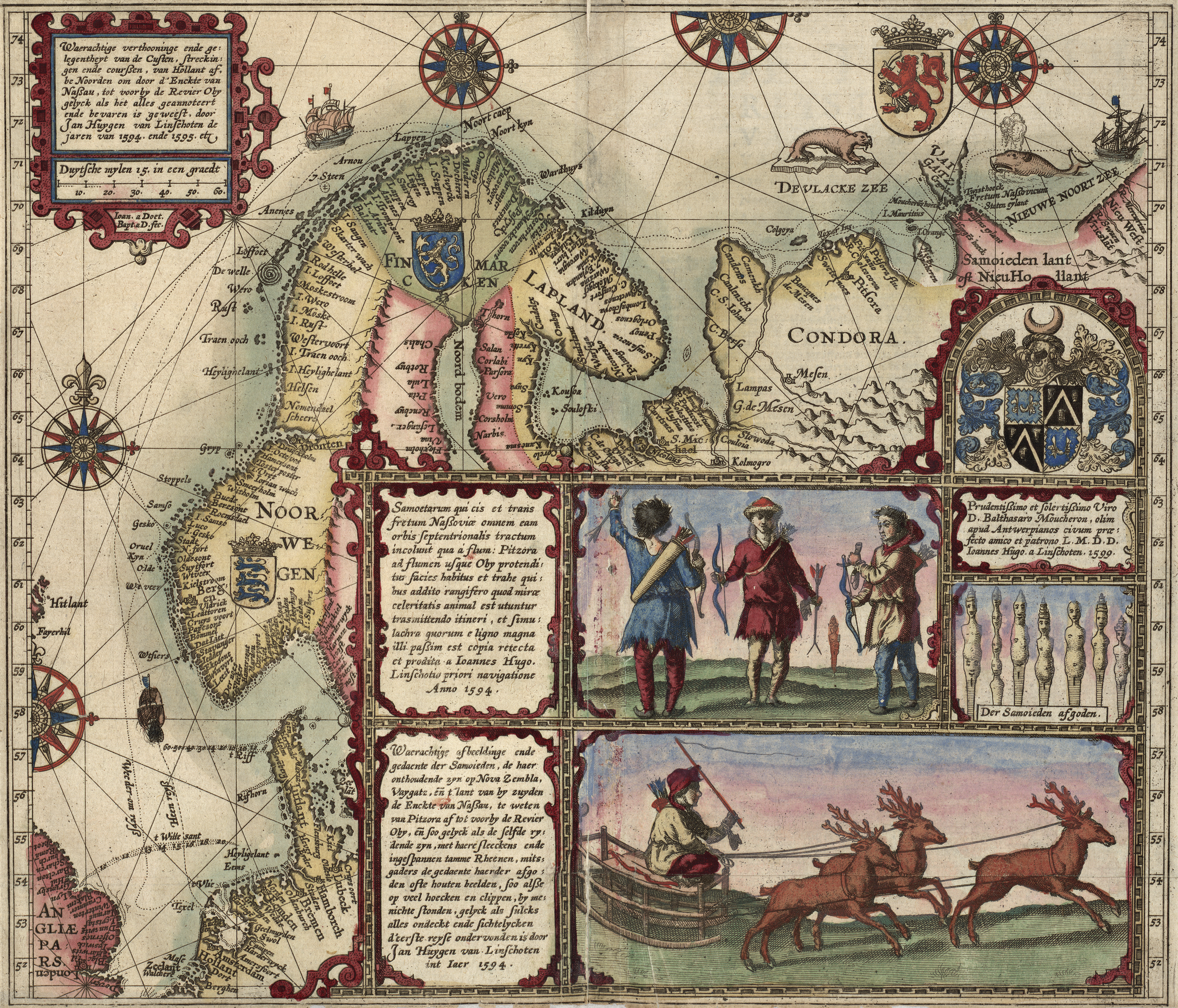
June 5: First voyage of Willem Barents in search of the Northeast Passage.

1594 (MDXCIV) was a common year starting on Saturday of the Gregorian calendar and a common year starting on Tuesday of the Julian calendar, the 1594th year of the Common Era (CE) and Anno Domini (AD) designations, the 594th year of the 2nd millennium, the 94th year of the 16th century, and the 5th year of the 1590s decade. As of the start of 1594, the Gregorian calendar was 10 days ahead of the Julian calendar, which remained in localized use until 1923.

== Events ==
=== January–March ===
- January 3 – Longvek, the capital of the Kingdom of Cambodia, is conquered by the army of the Ayutthaya Kingdom (now Thailand), commanded by King Naresuan, after more than two years of war. King Chey Chettha I of Cambodia is able to flee to Laos, along with the former King Satha I, but the rest of the royal family is taken hostage, along with Prince Srei Soriyopear.
- January 17 – Construction of the Junagarh Fort in the Mughal Empire's principality of Bikaner (now in India's Rajasthan state) is completed after almost five years.
- January 24 – William Shakespeare's play Titus Andronicus, is given its first performance, presented by the Admiral's Men company of players at The Rose in London.
- January 25 – The siege of Enniskillen Castle in Ireland (at County Fermanagh) is started by English commander John Dowdall, but is abandoned after one month.
- February 2 – England's Admiral Richard Hawkins and the crew of the ship HMS Dainty become the first Europeans to see the Falkland Islands.
- February 19 – The coronation of Sigismund III Vasa as King of Sweden takes place at Uppsala.
- February 27 – The coronation of Henry IV as King of France takes place at Chartres Cathedral.
- March 18 – Two warships of the English Navy, commanded by Captain James Langton, complete a three-day raid on the Spanish city of Puerto de Caballos (now Puerto Cortés in Guatemala) and pillage the city.

=== April–June ===
- April 17 – Hyacinth of Poland is canonized by Pope Clement VIII.
- April 27 – After suppressing the Serbian uprising in Banat, the Ottoman Empire rulers carry out the public burning of the bones of Saint Sava in Belgrade.
- May 6 – The siege of the Spanish-held city of Coevorden ends after six months as the city surrenders to the Dutch Republic.
- May 14 – After almost two years of being closed because of bubonic plague, theaters in England are allowed to reopen, as the Admiral's Men stage a performance of The Jew of Malta.
- May 19 – The Siege of Groningen by the Dutch Republic begins with an attack of 10,000 soldiers against the Spanish-held city. The Spanish commander surrenders after two months on July 22.
- June 5 – Willem Barents makes his first voyage to the Arctic Ocean, in search of the Northeast Passage.
- June 11 – Philip II of Spain recognizes the rights and privileges of the local nobles and chieftains in the Philippines, which paves the way for the stabilization of the rule of the Principalía.
- June 23 – A cargo ship explosion kills over 700 people the day after three English Navy ships— the Mayflower, Sampson and Royal Exchange— set fire to the Portuguese carrack Cinco Chagas off of the coast of Faial Island during the Anglo-Spanish War. The treasure inside, gathered from the East Indies, sinks in the north Atlantic Ocean. Only 13 people on the Cinco Chagas survive, and the cargo is lost.

=== July–September ===
- July 1 – Anglo-Spanish War: Action of Atacames Bay – English privateer Richard Hawkins in the Dainty is attacked and captured by a Spanish squadron off Esmeraldas (now in Ecuador).
- July 3 – The Ayutthayan–Cambodian War (1591–1594) concludes when Naresuan, ruler of the Ayutthaya Kingdom, sacks Longvek, capital of Cambodia.
- July 22 – After a two-month siege, the city of Groningen submits to Dutch troops, bringing the whole northern Netherlands under the Dutch Republic.
- August 25 – San Luis, in the Viceroyalty of Peru (now in Argentina), is founded by Luis Jufré de Loaysa y Meneses.
- August 28 – Farkas Kovacsóczy, who has served as Chancellor of Transylvania for 16 years, is arrested on orders of Prince Sigismund Báthory, and István Jósika is appointed in his place. Kovacsóczy is imprisoned at Szamosújvár (now Gherla in Romania) and executed by strangulation on September 11.
- August 30 – Diplomats meet at Stirling Castle for the Masque at the baptism of Prince Henry, heir to the throne of Scotland.
- September 6 – In France, Morlaix, a walled city in Brittany controlled by the Spanish Army and the Ligue catholique, is besieged by the French Royal Army led by Marshal Jean VI d'Aumont. The French Army is supplemented by 2,000 troops commanded by John Norreys.
- September 17 – A fleet of six ships, commanded by the privateer Martin Frobisher, arrives at Morlaix and prepares to bombard the city, under siege by the French Army. The Spanish Army commander of the Morlaix garrison surrenders, rather than facing the city's destruction.

=== October–December ===
- October 1 – The siege of Fort Crozon begins as an English and French army attacks the Spanish held fortress at the Pointe des Espagnols in France.
- October 3 – The Battle of Glenlivet in Scotland: The Protestant forces loyal to King James VI, assisted by the armies of 8 clans and led by the Earl of Argyll, oppose Roman Catholic rebels supported by Clan Gordon (led by the Earl of Huntley), Clan Hay (led by the Earl of Errol), Clan Comyn and Clan Cameron. Despite being outnumbered 5 to 1, the Catholic clans win the battle, killing 500 of the Protestant forces.
- October 9 – Sinhalese–Portuguese War – Campaign of Danture: Forces of the Kingdom of Kandy gain a decisive victory over the Portuguese Empire, reversing near-total control of Sri Lanka by Portugal. Pedro Lopes de Sousa, the Governor of Portuguese Ceylon, is killed in the battle, and replaced on December 24 by Jerónimo de Azevedo.
- November 13 – After the Principality of Wallachia (now in Romania) joins other Eastern European nations in a Holy League, a rebellion breaks out in Bucharest as Christian residents massacre the soldiers of the Ottoman Muslim garrison, entering Wallachia into the ongoing Thirteen Years' War.
- November 18 – The Spanish fortress at Château de Brest in France falls after a siege of five months.
- November 19 – The siege of Fort Crozon by English and French soldiers ends with a massacre of all but 13 of the nearly 400 Spaniards living there, including women and children.
- December 2 – The proposal for the Union of Brest (moving the Metropolitan of Kiev, Galicia and all Rus from the ecclesiastical jurisdiction of the Eastern Orthodox Church to the Roman Catholic Church) is made in a petition by the Metropolitan Michael Rohoza in a petition to Sigismund, monarch of Poland, Lithuania, Sweden and Finland. After a similar petition to Pope Clement VIII on June 12, 1595, the Union will be proclaimed on October 8, 1596.
- December 15 – King Udai Singh of Marwar (now the Rajasthan and Punjab states of India and the Punjab province of Pakistan) returns to Lahore after having captured the Siwana fort.
- December 27 – French university student Jean Châtel attempts to assassinate King Henry IV of France, after gaining entrance into the King's office. Châtel attacks the monarch with a knife and causes a minor injury. After court jester Mathurine de Vallois intervenes, she detains Châtel until the King's bodyguard can carry out the arrest. Two days later, Chatel is executed by dismemberment. The Collège de Clermont, the Jesuit institution, where Châtel was a student, is closed, and the order of the Jesuits is temporarily banned.
- December 28 – The earliest known performance of William Shakespeare's play The Comedy of Errors takes place at Gray's Inn in London, and is played by the Lord Chamberlain's Men acting company. The production is held before members of the English court on Innocents' Day as part of the Gray's Inn Christmas festivities.

=== Date unknown ===
- St. Paul's College is founded in Macau by Jesuits, being the first western style university in the far east.
- In Amsterdam, the Compagnie van Verre is created, with the goal of breaking the Portuguese monopoly on spice trade.
- Tulip bulbs planted by Carolus Clusius in the Hortus Botanicus Leiden, Holland, flower for the first time.
- The city of Pompeii is rediscovered more than 1,500 years after its burial by the eruption of Mount Vesuvius.

== Births ==
=== January–June ===
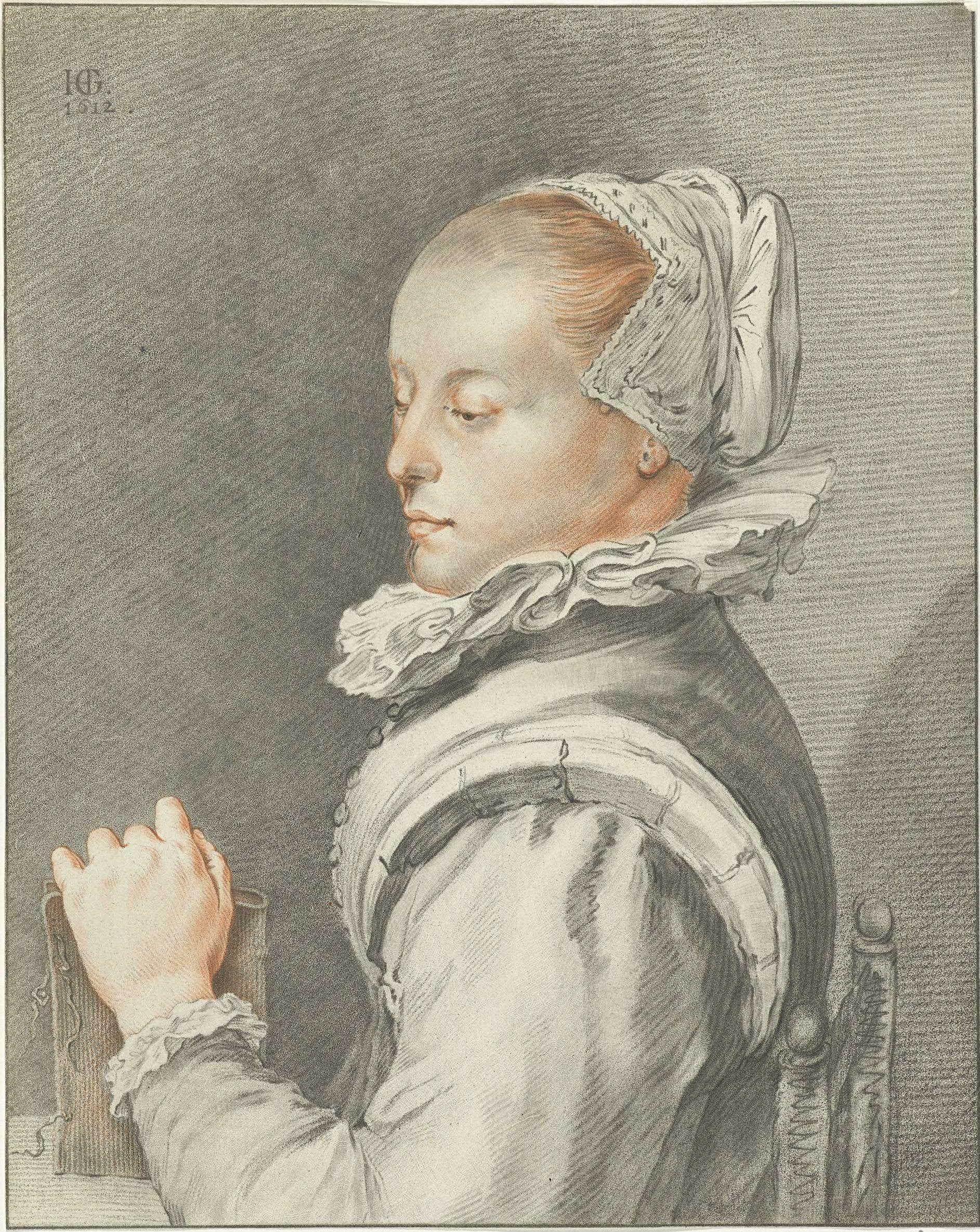
Maria Tesselschade Visscher

- January 1 – Barthélemy Vimont, French missionary (d. 1667)
- January 7 – Vincenzo II Gonzaga, Duke of Mantua, Italian duke and Catholic cardinal (d. 1627)
- January 12 – Gregers Krabbe, Governor-general of Norway (d. 1655)
- January 16 – Maeda Toshitsune, Japanese warlord (d. 1658)
- January 24 – Pierre de Marca, French bishop and historian (d. 1662)
- February 2 – Philip Powell, Welsh martyr (d. 1646)
- February 5 – Biagio Marini, Italian violinist and composer (d. 1663)
- February 16 – Juliana Morell, Spanish-French scholar (d. 1653)
- February 19 – Henry Frederick, Prince of Wales, elder son of King James I & VI and Anne of Denmark (d. 1612)
- February 21 – John Ernest I, Duke of Saxe-Weimar, German duke (d. 1626)
- February 26 – William Wadsworth, American colonial (d. 1675)
- March 25 – Maria Tesselschade Visscher, Dutch poet and engraver (d. 1649)
- April 21 – Bernardino Spada, Italian Catholic cardinal (d. 1661)
- April 29 – Samuel Fairclough, English minister (d. 1677)
- May 1 – John Haynes, governor of Connecticut (d. 1653)
- May 9 – Louis Henry, Prince of Nassau-Dillenburg, military leader in the Thirty Years' War (d. 1662)
- May 15 – Sophie of Solms-Laubach, wife of Joachim Ernst, Margrave of Brandenburg-Ansbach (d. 1651)
- May 29 – Gottfried Heinrich Graf zu Pappenheim, field marshal of the Holy Roman Empire in the Thirty Years' War (d. 1632)
- June 3 – César, Duke of Vendôme, French nobleman (d. 1665)
- June 11 – Thomas Cromwell, 1st Earl of Ardglass, English nobleman (d. 1653)
- June 23 – Thomas Tyrrell, English judge and politician (d. 1672)
- June – Nicolas Poussin, French painter (d. 1665)

=== July–December ===
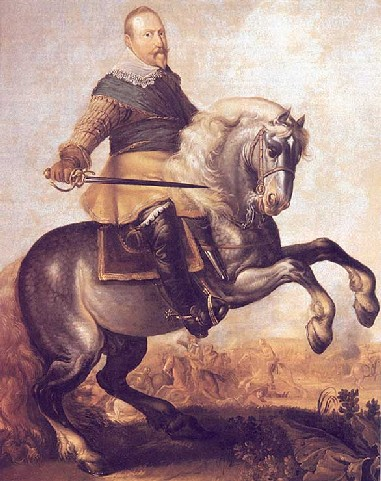
King Gustavus Adolphus of Sweden

- July 6 – Frederick V, Margrave of Baden-Durlach (1622–1659) (d. 1659)
- July 10 – Bartolomeo Gennari, Italian painter (d. 1661)
- July 14 – Beat Albrecht von Ramstein, German Catholic bishop (d. 1651)
- August 4 – Aleksander Ludwik Radziwiłł, Polish noble (d. 1654)
- August 5 – Stefano Durazzo, Italian cardinal (d. 1667)
- August 16 – Queen Inyeol, Korean royal consort (d. 1636)
- September 13 – Francesco Manelli, Italian composer (d. 1667)
- September 30 – Antoine Girard de Saint-Amant, French poet (d. 1661)
- October 4 – Johan Schatter, Dutch Golden Age member of the Haarlem schutterij (d. 1673)
- October 27 – Johann Rudolf Wettstein, Swiss diplomat (d. 1666)
- November 15 – Jean Puget de la Serre, French author and dramatist (d. 1665)
- November 24 – Henry Grey, 10th Earl of Kent (d. 1651)
- November 26 – James Ware, Irish genealogist (d. 1666)
- November 30 – John Cosin, English churchman (d. 1672)
- December 7 – Frederik Coning, Dutch Golden Age member of the Haarlem schutterij (d. 1636)
- December 8 – Pierre Petit, French astronomer, military engineer, and physicist (d. 1677)
- December 9 – King Gustavus Adolphus of Sweden, Swedish king and general (d. 1632)
- December 21 – Robert Sutton, 1st Baron Lexinton, English politician (d. 1668)
- December 24 – Otto, Landgrave of Hesse-Kassel, Prince of Hesse-Kassel, Administrator of Hersfeld Abbey (d. 1617)
- December 27 – Ove Gjedde, Danish admiral, member of the interim government after the death of Christian IV (d. 1660)

=== Date unknown ===
- John Bramhall, English Anglican clergyman and controversialist (d. 1663)
- Peter Oliver, English miniaturist (d. 1648)
- Tomasz Zamoyski, Polish nobleman (d. 1638)

=== Probable ===
- Tarquinio Merula, Italian composer (d. 1665)

== Deaths ==
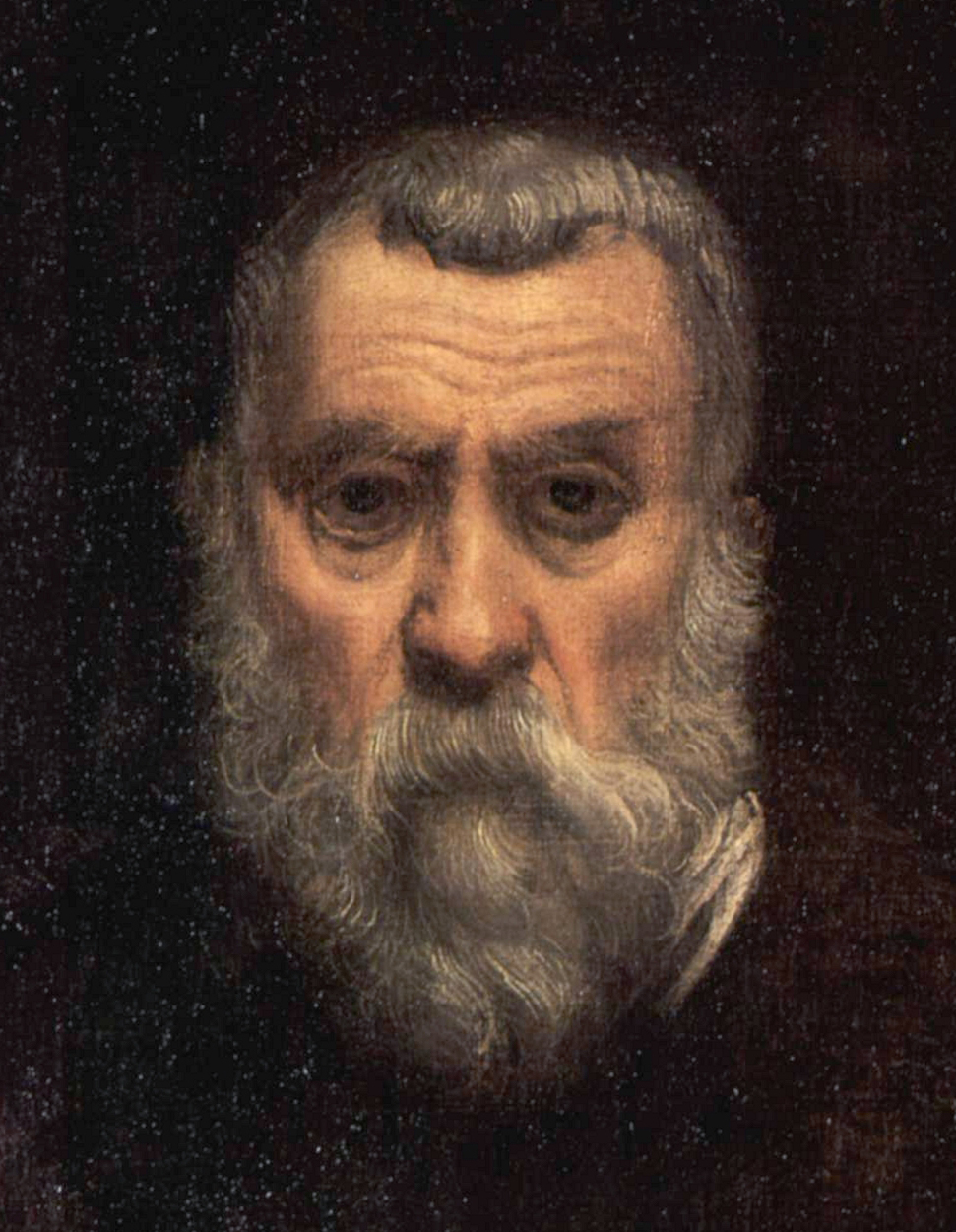
Tintoretto

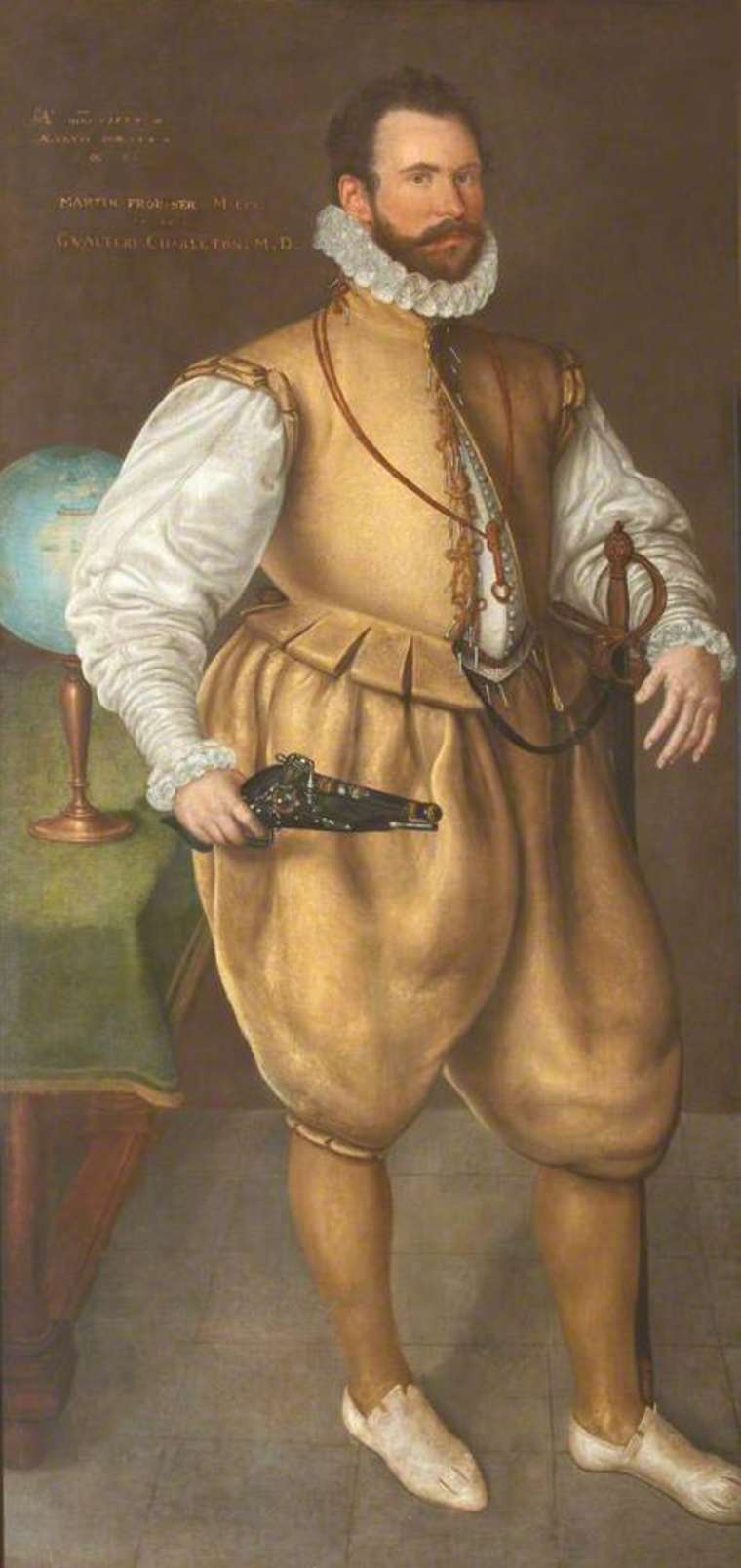
Martin Frobisher

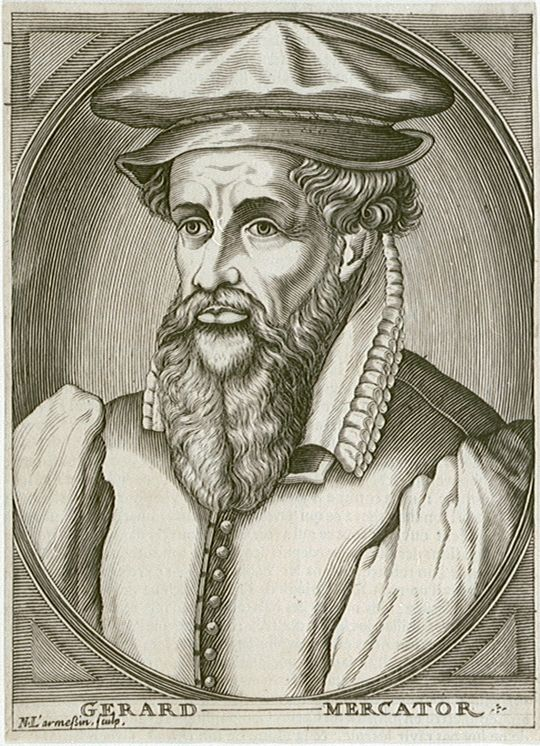
Gerardus Mercator

- February – Barnabe Googe, English poet (b. 1540)
- February 2 – Giovanni Pierluigi da Palestrina, Italian composer (b. 1525)
- February 8 – Countess Palatine Elisabeth of Simmern-Sponheim, Duchess of Saxony (b. 1540)
- April 16 – Ferdinando Stanley, 5th Earl of Derby (b. 1559), second in line to the throne of England
- April 29 – Thomas Cooper, English bishop, lexicographer, and writer (b. c. 1517)
- May 2 – Edward Atslowe, English physician
- May 15 – Charlotte de La Marck, French duchess (b. 1574)
- May 30 – Bálint Balassi, Hungarian writer and noble (b. 1554)
- May 31
  - Tintoretto, Italian painter (b. 1518)
  - Francesco Panigarola, Italian bishop (b. 1548)
- June 3 – John Aylmer, English divine (b. 1521)
- June 7 – Rodrigo Lopez, Queen Elizabeth's physician (executed for treason) (b. 1525)
- June 14 – Orlande de Lassus, Flemish composer (b. 1532)
- June 29 – Niels Kaas, Danish chancellor (b. 1535)
- July – Girolamo Mei, Italian historian and humanist (b. 1519)
- July 10 – Paolo Bellasio, Italian composer and organist (b. 1554)
- August 5 – Archduchess Eleanor of Austria (b. 1534)
- October 8 – Ishikawa Goemon, Japanese ninja and thief (b. 1558)
- October 16 – William Allen, English cardinal (b. 1532)
- November 15 – Sir Martin Frobisher, British explorer (b. 1535)
- November 20 – Gaspar de Quiroga y Vela, General Inquisitor of Spain (b. 1512)
- November 29 – Alonso de Ercilla y Zúñiga, Basque soldier and poet (b. 1533)
- December 2 – Gerardus Mercator, Flemish-German cartographer (b. 1512)
- December 16 – Allison Balfour, alleged Scottish witch
- date unknown
  - John Johnson, English lutenist and composer (b. c. 1545)
  - Thomas Kyd, author of The Spanish Tragedy (b. 1558)
