= Fall of Longvek =

1594 fall of the Khmer capital

Siamese invasion of Longvek (1594)
- Part of Siamese–Cambodian War (1591–1594)
Date	1594
Location	Longvek
Result	Siamese victory

Belligerents
Ayutthaya Kingdom	Longvek

Commanders and leaders
Naresuan; Chakri	Satha I

The fall of Longvek, also known as the sack of Longvek or siege of Longvek or also Siamese invasion of Longvek, was the final act of the Siamese–Cambodian War which lasted from 1591 to 1594 and after which the Khmer capital Longvek was ransacked and looted. After the Khmer refused to recognize Ayutthaya authority, the Ayutthaya Kingdom besieged Longvek and sacked the capital city. After the fall of Angkor, the conquest of Longvek was another blow to Khmer sovereignty, which was not restored for many more centuries, initiating the period known as the "dark age" of Cambodia.

== Sources ==
The events concerning the Siamese army sacking the capital of Longvek at the end of the 16th century are mentioned in certain non-concording sources, such as:

- the Cambodian Royal Chronicles, especially in the one published by Thiounn in 1936
- the Luang Prasoet Chronicle of Ayutthaya, originally written in 1780 AD, in the reign of king Narayana. It was translated into English and studied by Frankfurter, and published in the Journal of the Siam Society in 1909. This chronicle was also translated into Khmer language by the Thai-Khmer Cultural Association Committee in 2009.
- some European sources, among which the contemporary witness of Spanish soldier Antonio de Morga.

Cross-examination of the various sources allows for a critical history of the fall of Longvek. Thus, Khmer inscriptions, in particular the inscription of Wat Romlok registered as K.27, was corroborated with Spanish and Portuguese sources to agree on the date of the fall of Longvek as 1594 where Siamese Chronicles mistakenly fixed it to the year 1583.

== History ==
=== Background ===
Khmer King Ang Chan I (1516–1566) is said to have moved and founded the new capital north of Phnom Penh to Longvek on the banks of the Tonle Sap River. Trade was an essential feature, although they seem to have a secondary role in the Asian commercial domain in the 16th century, Cambodian ports did indeed develop.

Cambodia was attacked by the Thai prince and warlord Naresuan in 1583. In 1591 an army of 100,000 men led by the king of Siam Phra Naret captured Battambang and ravaged Cambodia. A Portuguese named Diogo Veloso arrived with a handful of men to form the Royal Guard, he was joined by a Spaniard Blas Ruiz in 1592. The two men became the favorites of the king, who was named by Portuguese and Spanish authors “Apram Langara” or “Prauncar Langara”. They encouraged him to seek an alliance with the Spaniards established in the Philippines thus threatening the Siamese domination of the Khmer Empire since their defeat at Angkor in 1431.

At the time just before the final battle of Longvek, Ayutthaya was under attack from Burma. While the Thai Chronicles argue that the Khmer tried to seize the moment of weakness to invade Siam, the Khmer Chronicles recount that after coming in aid to the Siamese and helping them to chase out the Burmese invader, the Khmer were betrayed in their retreat by the Siamese who figured they could easily cut through the exhausted Khmer troops and eradicate the Khmer Empire which it had already plundered at the fall of Angkor. In fact, the settlement of Longvek had allowed the Khmer kings to rebuild their might since 1516. While Siam was confronted with the Burmese threat, the Khmers were in the process of reinvesting the site of Angkor and regaining lost ground. This desire to bring back to glory of Angkor is indicated by the Khmer inscription registered as IMA 3, which describes the fact that in 1501 śaka (1579), king Chey Chettha I known as Satha I in the Cambodian Chronicles, took his sons to Preah Pishnoulok, i.e. Angkor Wat, for a religious ceremony, in order to dedicate them to the Buddha and all the gods. Restoring the Khmer grandeur of Angkor and the glory of the Varman dynasty was maybe what the attack from Siam tried to avoid.

=== Siamese attack ===
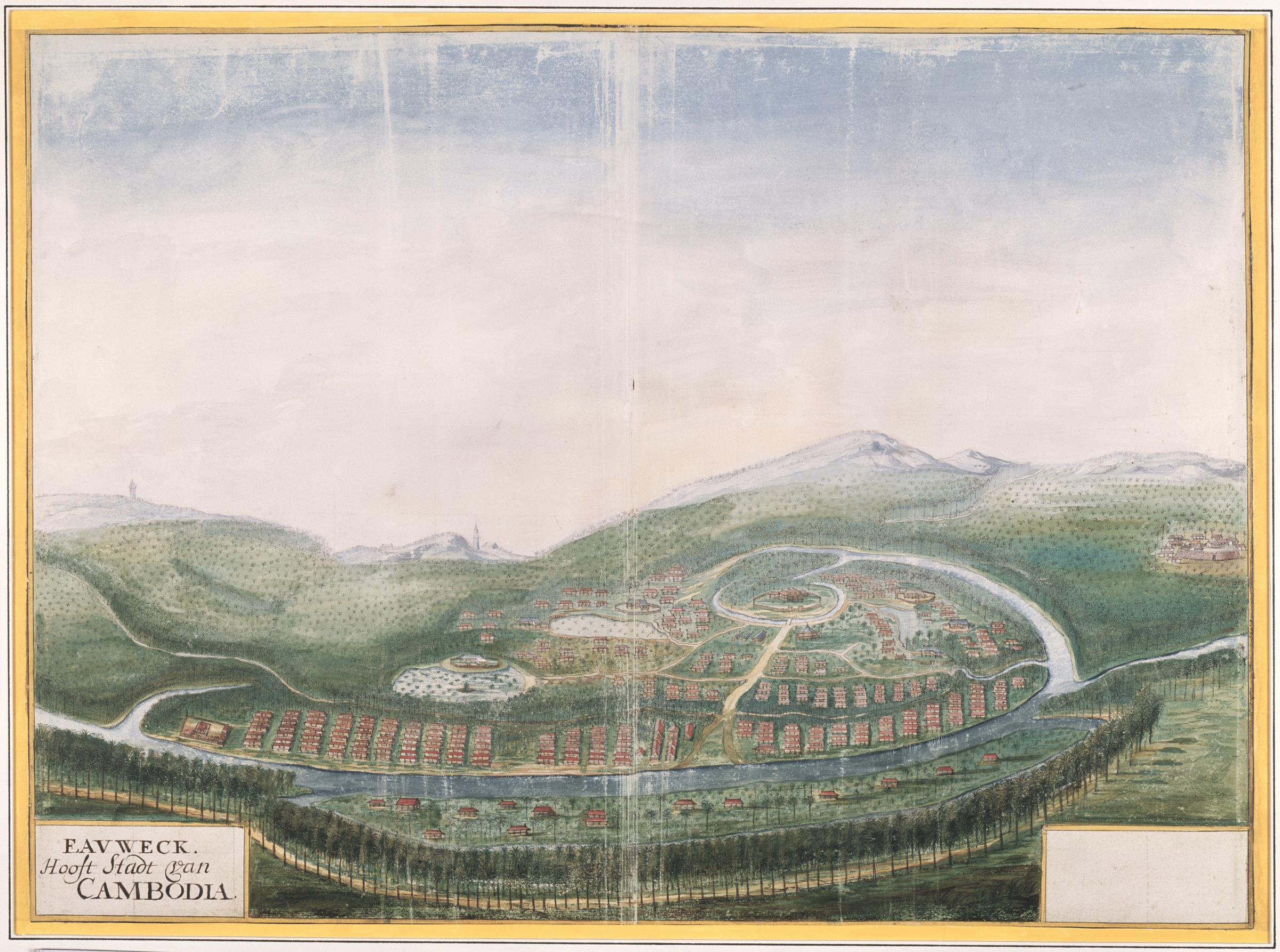
The city of Longvek as drawn by Dutch merchants before 1594, as shown in the centre of this illustration, is surrounded by hills, forests and a river.

A first Siamese campaign against Cambodia was launched in 1591, and the Longvek citadel was besieged but after three months, a combination of logistical issues and Cambodian counterattacks forced the Thais to retreat beyond the border.

After years of war, the Khmer troops were worn out and defeats both on water, decimating the Khmer navy, and on land, at fortresses such as Pursat, forced them to retreat to Longvek where the Siamese forces converged for a final battle. Soryopor assumed direct command of the defenses as his brother Chey Chettha had by that time abandoned the capital city. Assisted by his own Spanish and Portuguese mercenaries Soryopor reinforced the walls with cannons and spikes, while also requesting assistance from Vietnam and the Spanish governor of Manila.

Siamese engineers began the siege by erecting earthworks that surpassed the city's fortifications in height, thus enabling them to fire directly at the city. The Cambodians responded by building a second wall that shielded the city from bombardment. On 3 January 1594, following an hour long artillery preparation, Naresuan's army stormed the city. Siamese war elephants went on to break the city gates, allowing the infantry to penetrate the inner walls and slay the remnants of the garrison.

According to Khmer Chronicles, the city remained impregnable by the Siamese because it was surrounded by a thick bamboo forest which formed a natural wall. The Siamese would have thrown silver coins into the bamboo ramparts protecting the Khmer city in order to trap the guards. These Khmer soldiers, eager to obtain this gold, would have razed the forest to recover this loot, thus depriving themselves of their protection and giving the city into the hands of the Siamese invaders. The themes of desire and of lack of virtue leading to the loss of Cambodia's most valuable, integrative, healing power are woven throughout this story.

=== Khmer deportation ===
Following the Siam capture of the capital at Longvek, 90,000 Cambodians, including Prince Soryopor, were taken to Ayutthaya. Although King Satha managed to escape into neighboring Laos, Cambodian royals were taken hostage and relocated to the court of Ayutthaya, kept under permanent Siamese influence, and left to compromise and out-compete each other under the overlord's scrutiny.

== Factors ==
=== Dynastic dispute ===
A dynastic dispute may have been a factor in the fall of Longvek. According to the Cambodian Chronicles, after King Satha decided to transfer his power to his two sons, the elder of whom was 11 years of age and the other 6, the Uparāja Srī Suriyobarm and mandarins felt frustrated that such young men would be appointed to lead the nation in a time of crisis. When the King took his two sons with him in exile to Laos instead of fighting the Siamese invader, the Khmer mandarins allowed the Siamese army to enter the capital easily, without any strong resistance.

=== Religious instability ===
While the Khmer people gradually walked away from Vedic religions and adopted Buddhism as the new religion, religious instability, as indicated by the conversion of Islam to of a Khmer ruler in the 17th century and the arrival of Catholic missionaries such as Gaspar da Cruz, is also illustrated in an event of iconoclasm related in the Cambodian Chronicles. The Khmer king of Longvek considered their tutelary deities as the Buddha Kaya Siddhi image at Wat Brah Inda Deba and the worship of Khleang Moeung at his shrine.Two wizards, both experts in black magic and disguised as Buddhist monks, were sent to Cambodia by the Siamese king. Luring him with a charm, they convinced the Khmer king Satha to destroy the four-faced statue of Buddha Kaya Siddhi and the as well as Buddha of Wat Tralaeng Kaeng with any remains thrown into the river. As an ominous sign, the sacred sword of Khmer kingship, Preah Khan Reach, rusted while the sacred spring at Banon in Battambang Province dried up. A Buddha image at Wat Vihear Suor bled and the leaves of a bodhi tree at Longvek fell out of season while an epidemic of cholera spread to all the corners of the kingdom. According to the same Chronicles, "only when the pieces of the sacred images were recovered, reassembled, and restored to their rightful place was the enemy repulsed".

=== Military inferiority ===
The military defeat may be due to shortcomings in terms of artillery, as suggested by the Cambodian chronicles composed in the late 18th-early 19th century regarding the fall of Longvek. In fact, both the iron elephant sent against Preah Ko and the gold coins thrown into the bamboo forest may be an example maybe a narrative symbol of the military might of the Siamese, equipped with cannons and musketeers: this legend must be understood as an evocation of the capacity of the Siamese to line up battalions armed with rifles in marching order.

== Aftermath ==
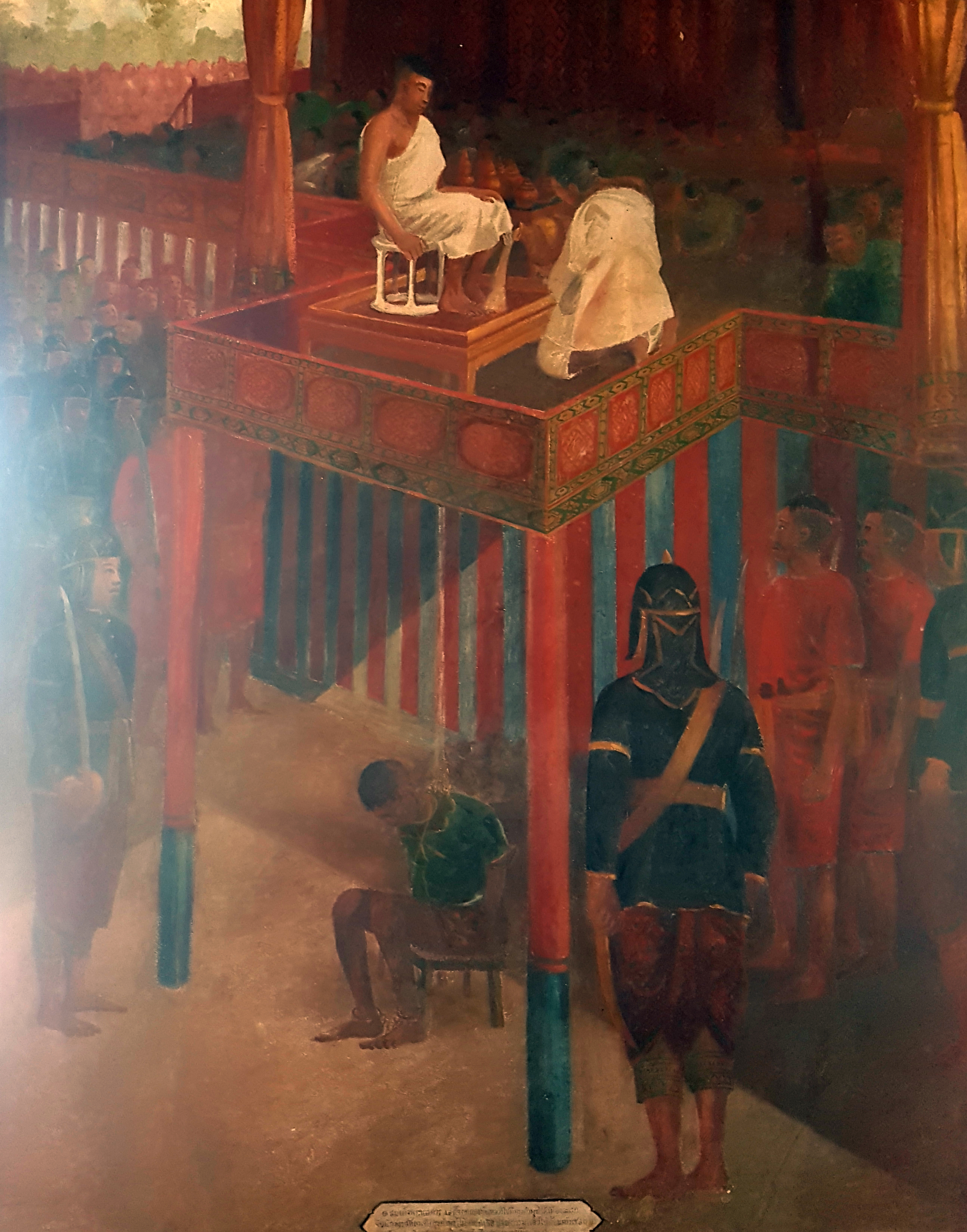
Paintings in Wat Suwandararam in depict Naresuan the king of Ayutthaya subjecting Satha I to a humiliating ritual before beheading him. Whether or not this event actually took place is disputed amongst modern scholars.

=== Casualties ===
After three months of siege, the fall of Longvek was a victory by surrender rather than a bloodshed. The deportation of Khmer elites to Siam and the material looting of Longvek was the greatest casualty after the fall of Longvek. As such, it was the final defeat inflicted by the Siamese on the Khmer kingdom, and it had a lasting effect on Khmer pride.

The capture and destruction of Longvek in 1594 by King Naresuan of Ayutthaya were cataclysmic.

=== Sovereignty lost ===
The fall of Longvek made the situation worse than after the fall of Angkor as Khmer sovereignty was almost completely lost; the military defeat and the exile of the king created mistrust for it rulers among the nation, which was rendered almost impossible more difficult to reform even after the restoration of the royalty in Oudong. To this day, this betrayal of Cambodian elites at Longvek is often recalled by opposition leaders, some accusing the leaders of Cambodia in the 20th century of giving away their country to foreign nations once more:

The rampant selling off of the country's resources that is taking place in Cambodia lends fuel to [the] analogy between today's lack of wise leadership and the Longvek king; duped by tricksters, unvirtuous leaders give away Cambodia's riches and, with it, her integrity.

=== Poisoned relationships between Thai and Khmers ===
In the Siamese Chronicles, King Naresuan needed to obtain revenge from the Khmer who had abused him when he was in a weak place after the Burmese invasion of Ayuatthaya. Once victorious in Longvek, he would have ordered the capture of the Khmer sovereign in exile in order to be beheaded and to wash his feet with the blood. The ritual known as phithi pathomkam (Khmer: ពិធីបឋមកម្ម) ritual was linked to black magic charms to curse all the Khmers as well as all the future generations and Khmer descendant. The seven-day ritual is illustrated to this day in the frescoes of Wat Suwandararam in Thailand. Thai-Khmer relations are still extremely delicate on this moment of history: both Khmer historian Sambo Manara and Thai scholar Kajorn Sukhapanich have argued that this event was invented in the 18th century as the Khmer king Satha had fled and taken refuge in Laos and not in Siam.

The fall of Longvek was not without drama in the life and psychology of the Khmer people. Regardless of precise historical accuracy, the Khmers and others either directly speak of the “fall of Longvek” or they speak of the incident indirectly, by using expressions like “deported by the Siamese.”

— Nhim Sotheavin, Considerations on the fall of Longvek

== See also ==
- Siamese-Cambodian War (1591-1594)
- King Naresuan
- King Satha I
