= Devikshatri =

Queen consort of Cambodia

Devikshatri (Or Moha Devikshatri)
- queen consort of Cambodia in Longvek period
- Reign: 1576–1584
- Predecessor: Pov Phivong Thom (chief consorts)
- Successor: Srey Vlak (Third consorts)
- Spouse: Barom Reachea IV (Satha I)
- Father: Ang Chan I
- Religion: Buddhism Cambodian style ( together with Cambodian folk religion（ Animism ) and Hinduism Cambodian style)

Devikshatri (fl. 1603) was queen consort of Cambodia. She played an important role in politics as queen mother and orchestrated the accession of two of her grandsons.

She was the Second queen of king Satha I and the foster mother of king Chey Chettha I. Her son was deposed by Preah Ram I in 1594, in the confusion following the Thai sack. Her grandson Barom Reachea II retook his father's throne in 1596. He was succeeded by his brother Barom Reachea III.

When he died in 1600, queen Devikshatri supported her sixteen-year-old grandson, Nom, a third son of King Sattha, to ascend the throne. She convinced the officials and ministers and arranged for his succession as Kaev Hua I.

In 1603, she withdrew her support to the king. She consulted the oknha, and then successfully asked the Thai king to release her husband's second son, Suriyobarna, as she considered him more worthy of the throne. Devikshatri "called all the ministers together and consulted with them ... [then] stripped her grandson prince Nom of sovereignty, gathered the royal family and the court, and offered the throne to Suriyobarna". Suriyobarna then succeeded as king Srei Soriyopear.
