= Preah Ram I =

King of Cambodia

King of Cambodia
- Reign: 1594–1596
- Predecessor: Chey Chettha I
- Successor: Preah Ram II
- Born: 1544; Cambodia
- Died: 1596 (aged 51–52); Sri Sundhara, Cambodia
Names
- Samdach Brhat Rama Jung Praya Rajadipati Parama Rajadhiraja Maha Bupati
- Religion: Buddhism

Preah Ram I (1544–May 1596), also known as Reamea Chung Prey or Onkar Brah Pandul (Note: Rendered in Spanish sources as "Huncar Pravancul"), was the Cambodian king ruled from 1594 to 1596.

== History ==
In 1594, Cambodia was attacked by Ayyuthaya, Chey Chettha I and Satha I. After the Siamese captured Longvek, Preah Ram I Defeat The Siamese Army And fled the capital. Preah Ram I seized the throne during the absence of the king. His court included several Spanish and Portuguese courtiers and clerics, whom he expelled after war with Siam started again. These men found their way to Manila, where the government dispatched 120 Spanish soldiers and a handful of Japanese mercenaries to end Preah Ram I's rule. In May 1596, he was fatally shot at Sri Sundhara by the Portuguese and Spanish troops of Diogo Veloso and Blas Ruiz.

== See also ==
- Siamese–Cambodian War (1591–1594)
- Cambodian–Spanish War
- Fall of Longvek

Preah Ram I Varman Dynasty Born: 1544 Died: May 1596
Regnal titles
| Preceded by Chey Chettha I | King of Cambodia; 1594–1596 | Succeeded by Preah Ram II |
