= Cambodian–Spanish War =

Spanish led late-16th-century invasion of Cambodia

- Part of Siamese–Cambodian War (1591–1594)
- Cambodian-Spanish War Map
Date	1593–1597; 1599
Location	Cambodia, Phnom Penh
Result	Cambodian victory

Belligerents
Kingdom of Cambodia	Spanish Empire; Spanish protectorate in Cambodia

Commanders and leaders
Preah Ram I †; Preah Ram II †; Laksamana	Luis Pérez Dasmariñas; Gregorio Vargas Machuca; Blas Ruiz de Hernán Gonzáles †; Diogo Veloso †; Juan Juárez Gallinato †; Suarez Gallinato; Luis Ortiz

Strength
Unknown	1596: 3 ships 200–400 soldiers & mercenaries 1599: 4 ships

Casualties and losses
Unknown	2 ships wrecked Nearly all killed

The Cambodian–Spanish War (Spanish: Guerra Ibero-Camboyana; Filipino: Digmaang Kambodyano-Espanyol; Khmer: សង្គ្រាមកម្ពុជា-អេស្ប៉ាញ) (1593–1599) was an attempt to conquer Cambodia on behalf of King Satha I and Christianize Cambodia's population by the Spanish and Portuguese Empires. Along with the Spanish, Filipinos, Mexican recruits, Japanese mercenaries participated in the invasion of Cambodia.

== Background ==
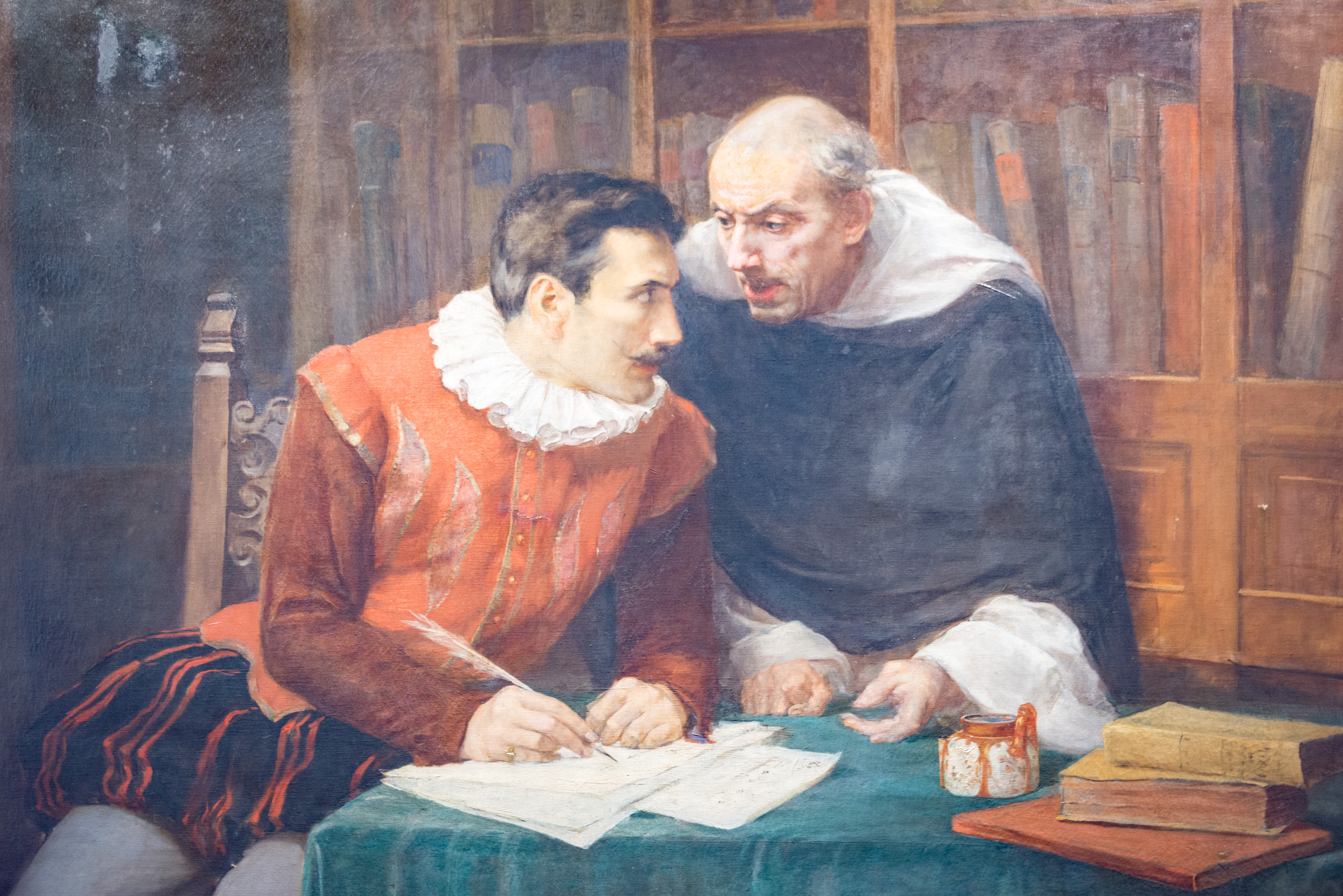
Painting of Luis Pérez Dasmariñas and Fray Domingo de Salazar discussing a military expedition to Cambodia

Each power that participated in the war possessed different motives for their invasion of Cambodia; specifically, the Siamese (Thai) interference in Cambodian affairs and the Spanish expedition resulting from the power struggle between rival factions in Cambodia's government. Both Spanish and Portuguese took part in the invasion of Cambodia because King Philip II ruled both Spain and Portugal as the Iberian Union.

In February 1593, Siamese ruler Naresuan attacked Cambodia. Later on, in May 1593, 100,000 Siamese soldiers invaded Cambodia. The increasing Siamese expansion, which later got the approval of China, drove the Cambodian king Satha I to search for allies overseas, ultimately finding it in Portuguese adventurer Diogo Veloso and his Spanish associates Blas Ruiz de Hernán Gonzáles and Gregorio Vargas Machuca.

The Iberian adventurers tried to raise reinforcements from Portuguese Malacca, but were unsuccessful, and the same happened in the Spanish Philippines, when the governor Gómez Pérez Dasmariñas rejected their plan of an alliance with Cambodia, and chose to try to arbitrate the conflict between Cambodia and Siam. Dasmariñas was more concerned with protecting Portuguese trading interests in the Strait of Malacca. The Siamese conquered the Cambodian capital Longvek in July 1594 and Satha was executed or fled to Laos.

The three Iberian adventurers, now accompanied by Pantaleón Carnero and Antonio Machado, were captured and sent to Siam. However, Veloso and Vargas convinced Naresuan to send them as emissaries to Manila, where they escaped, while Ruiz and the rest managed to seize the junk that carried them as prisoners. They all reunited in Manila, where they organized a military expedition.

== History ==
=== Conflict ===
The Iberian adventurers' attempts in the Philippines to gain support for a Cambodian expedition faced much skepticism and so took more than a year to organize. In July 1593 king Satha I sent an embassy to Manila asking for Spanish military help to defend Cambodia. The embassy consisted of Portuguese Diogo Veloso, who had been living in his court since 1583, and Spanish Gregorio de Vargas Machuca. Satha I kept Spanish Blas Ruiz de Hernan Gonzalez as captain of his bodyguard. Veloso came back in February 1594, alone and without help. After Ayutthaya's attack on Cambodia, Veloso, Blas Ruiz and de Vargas Machuca found themselves in Manila. They continued to ask for help, and at last, Spanish Manila agreed to send 3 ships with 200 Spanish and Mexican soldiers, some Japanese and Filipino auxiliaries and some friars, under the commander Suarez Gallinato. The ship with Blas Ruiz was the only one that reached Cambodia. The one with Veloso was wrecked off the Mekong delta and Gallinato's ship was forced to go to Malacca due to the weather. The first Spanish expedition arrived in Cambodia in 1596 in three ships under the command of Juan Juárez Gallinato, having 400 Spanish soldiers, mostly from New Spain, and Filipino and Japanese Christian mercenaries. Gallinato's ship was driven away by a storm, but the other two, commanded by Ruiz and Veloso, reached Cambodia, where they learned the throne had been taken by the king's former vassal Preah Ram I. The presence of the Iberians became troublesome after they clashed with and defeated a force of 2000 Chinese, and in view of the king's hostility, Veloso advised the expedition to assault his palace and capture him. The assault was unsuccessful, as the king died, and the expedition was forced to rejoin Gallinato and escape. Gallinato then ordered the fleet to search for allies in Laos, but their failure forced them away, and the expedition disbanded shortly after.

In October of the same year, Ruiz and Veloso found an heir to Satha, his second son Barom Reachea II, who was supported by Laos. With their help, the young king invaded Cambodia and was enthroned in May 1597. The king granted the Iberians territorial rights over two provinces on the east and west sides of the Mekong River. Veloso later secured permission and funds to build a fort, but the situation was still unstable. In 1599, he commanded four ships from Manila but two of them were wrecked in a storm. The Malay Muslim admiral Laksamana, who opposed the Iberians, took advantage of the situation to provoke an attack on one of their men, Luis Ortiz. The Spaniards retaliated by attacking a Malay camp, but Cambodian, Malays and Chams attacked and slaughtered the Spaniards and Portuguese, including Diogo Veloso. Only a few Filipinos and one Spaniard survived the massacre.

Because of the defeat, the Spanish plan for the Christianization of Cambodia failed. Laksamana later had Barom Reachea II executed. Cambodia became dominated by the Siamese in July 1599. Satha was forced to flee and seek refuge in Lan Xang.

== See also ==
- Cambodian-Siamese War
- Cambodian–Dutch War
- Castilian War
- El Piñal
- Spanish East Indies
- Spanish–Moro conflict
