= Blas Ruiz =

Blas Ruiz de Hernán González or Blas Ruiz de Fernán González was an explorer from Ciudad Real, Spain.

== Travels ==
In the last decade of the 16th century, along with the Portuguese adventurer Diogo Veloso from Amarante, Blas Ruiz was the first European to ever set foot in Laos.

Ruiz's journey to Laos started in Cambodia. In Cambodia, Ruiz met and befriended King Satha of Lovek and Veloso of Portugal. During 1594 Veloso and Ruiz both met in Chordemuco (Phnom Penh), capital of Cambodia and the former Khmer empire, and entered the service of King Prauncar Langara (Satha I on Spanish sources); They obtained from him a promise to become a vassal and tributary of the king of Spain if the Spanish Empire (including Portuguese Empire on the Iberian Union) protected him from the aggressive king of Ayutthaya Kingdom, even promising to convert to Catholicism.

When Cambodia was invaded by Ayutthaya, Satha was overthrown by his son and other nobles who allowed Ayutthaya to take control, forcing Ruiz to flee to the Spanish colony of the Philippines, the place where he began his adventure in Southeast Asia. Eventually Ruiz returned with Veloso, who had fled to the Portuguese colony of Melaka, to Lovek. When they arrived they learned Satha had fled to Lan Xang, an empire centered in modern-day Laos and consisting of Isan, Stung Treng, and small areas of Southern China and Vietnam. Ruiz and Veloso decided to journey to Laos (Lan Xang) and bring back Satha to restore his reign over Lovek.

However, first both tried to negotiate with the usurper Preah Ram I and offering themselves as mediators on the dynastic disputes, and also develop trade relations between Spain and Cambodia, giving exotic gifts to the king (like american silver, but specially a donkey, very rare for the zone). But, the encounter went bad, because they were treated as merely barbarians (due to China influence, that was also against the former Cambodian dynasty and worried over their own business interests in the country, threatened by the Europeans), and also the king was angered because the gifted donkey make troubles in the king’s elephant corral. Finally, during a dispute after playing cards, several Chinese killed two Spaniards and a Japanese in their service (with the total indifference of the new authority), which provoke an end to the patience of Blas Ruiz, who caused a skirmish in the capital that ended with more than 300 Chinese dead, while the Iberians seized all the ships in the port. On May 1596, the king was alerted by the Chinese community about the incident, so he demanded the return of the ships and that the Spanish captains appear at his palace to negotiate. Fearing a trap, they did not attend the meeting and, after 2 days camping at the city gates, the Iberians crossed to the royal residence during the night. Reduced to only 40 Spaniards (including Portuguese) and 20 Japanese combat troops, they set fire to the stores and broke into the royal apartments, where they fired their muskets and killed the king with a bullet to the chest, also burning the royal chambers and ransacked the capital of all valuables. After that, both sailed back to Manila, while also recruited locals to swell their ranks (specially if they were still loyal to the former dynasty), and continued with their plan to go to Laos and find the rightful king and friends.

Then, Ruiz and Veloso arrived in Vientiane, Lan Xang's administrative capital, in the summer of 1596. They were met with a procession showing off the city's immense wealth consisting of Asian elephants, gold, jewels, silk, exotic snakes, bouquets of tropical flowers, chanting monks, Buddhist treasures and relics, music, and beautiful women. Ruiz and Veloso were also received with a great feast. But while they were in Vientiane they learned Satha had died from an illness he caught on his way from Cambodia to Laos. Saddened and angered by the news, Ruiz and Veloso returned to Lovek and started a rebellion to put one of Satha's political allies on the throne and free Cambodia from Ayatthaya. Also, they knew that the two firstborn sons of Satha also died (including the heir Chey Chettha I), and that a 12-year-old boy, Barom Reachea/Ponhea Ton, was the actual heir, who was assisted by a council of regency constituted by his stepmother (also Blas Ruiz’s lover), his grandmother and two of his aunts, as Cambodia had matrilineal customs. Both tried to gain influence on the boy by winning the women’s favor, achieving that the king named them as governors of Ba Phnum (modern Prey Veng Province) and of Treang (modern Takéo Province), as part of the contemplated Spanish protectorate.

They managed to drive out Ayutthaya forces from parts of Cambodia and create a new state but led the new Cambodian state into a brief period of chaos. Eventually Ruiz returned to the Philippines. It is not known whether he died there, Spain, or somewhere else.

In July 1593 king Satha I sent an embassy to Manila asking for Spanish military help to defend Cambodia. The embassy consisted of Portuguese Diogo Veloso, who had been living in his court since 1583, and Spanish Gregorio de Vargas Machuca. Satha I kept Spanish Blas Ruiz de Hernan Gonzalez as captain of his bodyguard. Veloso came back in February 1594, alone and without help. After Ayutthaya's attack on Cambodia, Veloso, Blas Ruiz and de Vargas Machuca found themselves in Manila. They continued to ask for help, and at last, Spanish Manila agreed to send 3 ships with 120 Spanish and Mexican soldiers, some Japanese and Filipino auxiliaries and some friars, under the commander Suarez Gallinato. The ship with Blas Ruiz was the only one that reached Cambodia. The one with Veloso was wrecked off the Mekong delta and Gallinato's ship was forced to go to Malacca due to the weather. Veloso rejoined Blas Ruiz at Phnom Penh in March 1596. At this point there is no evidence of their fate. They could be killed at Phnom Penh in July 1599 during a fight between Christians (Spanish and Filipinos) and Muslim Malay mercenaries of Barom Reacha II, who was Satha's son. Or they could return to Philippines. Satha had died in October 1597 after contracting disease after he fled to Lan Xang.

== See also ==
- Lovek
- Cambodian–Spanish War
- Spanish protectorate in Cambodia

== Bibliography ==
- Miguel de Jaque de los Rios Manzanedo Viaje de las Indias Orientales y Occidentales (Año 1606) REF.: LVI-5
- JOAQUIN MAÑES POSTIGO, LA QUIMERA DE UN REINO. DE LIBRUM TREMENS 2008. ISBN 978-84-935790-2-9 - Historical novel based on the adventures of Blas Ruiz
