= Cambodia–Thailand relations =

- Cambodia: Thailand

Diplomatic mission
- Royal Cambodian Embassy, Bangkok: Royal Thai Embassy, Phnom Penh

Envoy
- Minister Counsellor Thuch Dalin: Chargé d'Affaires Ek-On Kunacharoen

Bilateral relations between Cambodia and Thailand date to the 13th century during the Angkor Era. The Thai Ayutthaya Kingdom gradually displaced the declining Khmer Empire from the 14th century, French protectorateship separated Cambodia from modern Thailand at the turn of the 19th–20th centuries, and diplomatic relations between the modern states were established on 19 December 1950.

Relations between the two countries remain complicated. Incomplete demarcation of their boundaries has led to a protracted border conflict, most notably over the Khmer temple of Preah Vihear, which was awarded to Cambodia by the International Court of Justice in 1962 but still saw military clashes emerge in 2008 and 2011. During the Vietnam War, Thailand allowed the US military to bomb locations in Cambodia, as well as Laos and Vietnam, from Thailand's airbases. During this time, the US put more than $1billion into Thailand's economy and military, and built infrastructure connecting Thailand's cities to the countryside. Thailand reluctantly received Cambodian refugees and in 1979 forced some 45,000 Cambodian refugees down a cliff at gunpoint into minefields back into Cambodia, resulting in the deaths of 3,000-over 10,000 deaths. Thailand also supported the ousted Khmer Rouge at the border both financially and by providing shelter, as well as a weapons flow from China. Thailand now dominates over its poorer neighbour economically, and is the sixth largest investor in Cambodia.

Though relations are largely peaceful, the countries' peoples still bear a degree of enmity, and the two countries' shared cultural heritage has given rise to a fierce nationalist rivalry, often expressed through online flame wars over claims of ownership and origination of such heritage. These tensions have also erupted into violence when stoked by nationalist sentiments. Such episodes include a 2003 mob attack on the Thai Embassy in Phnom Penh, which prompted a downgrading of relations by Thailand. Thailand also downgraded relations in 2009 in response to the Cambodian government's support of former Thai Prime Minister Thaksin Shinawatra, while Cambodia terminated relations (represented by its embassy in Bangkok) twice in 1958 and 1961, during the Preah Vihear conflict.

In July 2025, violent clashes broke out between Thailand and Cambodia along their disputed border, resulting in over 30 deaths and the displacement of more than 270,000 people. 27 December 2025, both countries mutually agreed for ceasefire after long border disputes.

== History ==
=== Angkorian era ===
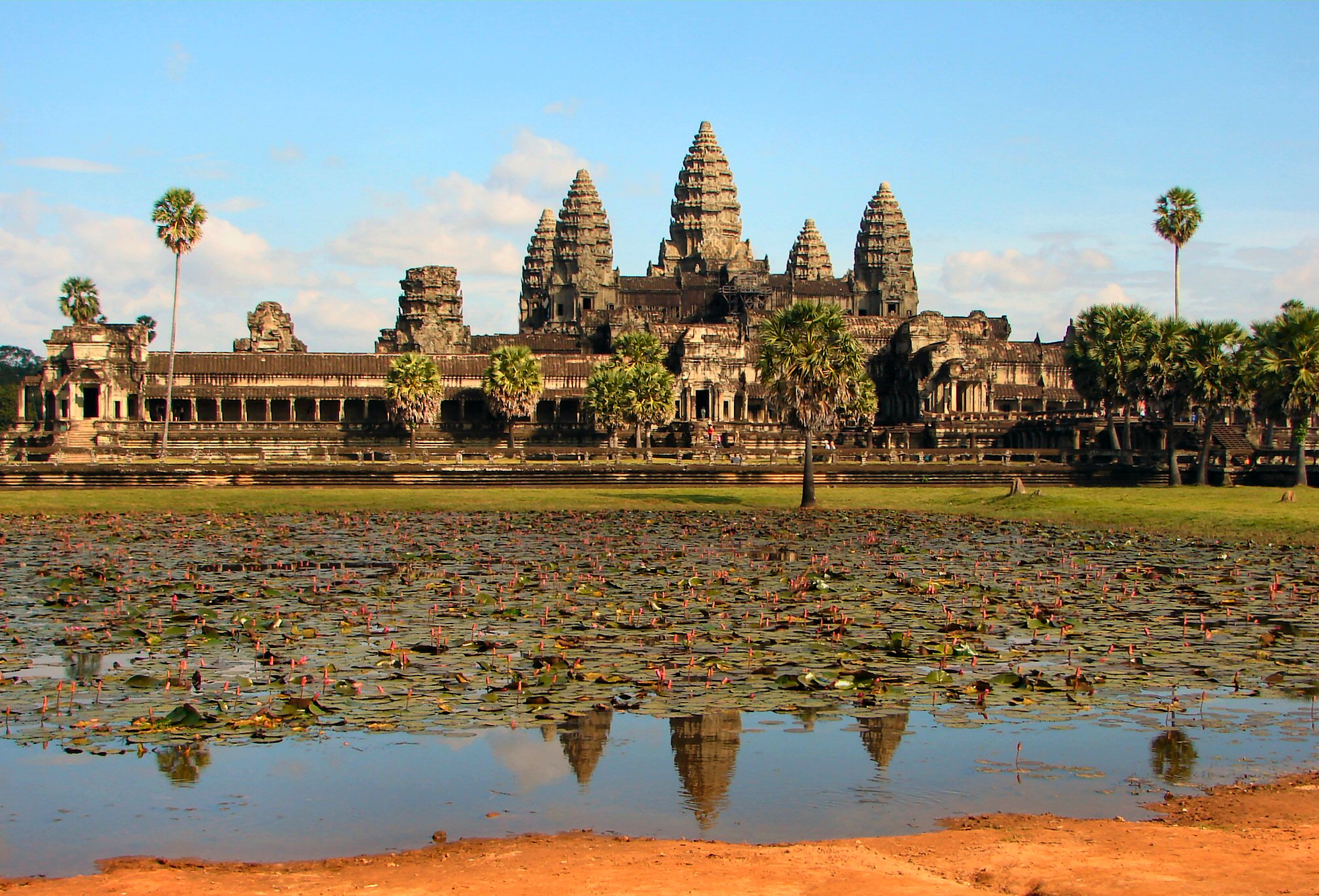
Angkor Wat.

=== Early period ===
The oldest evidence mentioning "syām" is found in the Angkor Borei inscription, dated 1154 CE, which reads "Ku syām" ("Syām [slave] woman") Michael Vickery notes that syām appears in eight Khmer inscriptions in the seventh century as the “proper name” of some workers. Vickery warns it’s “erroneous to attribute any special group characteristic" in this context. He notes “Syam” remains a personal name in Cambodia today, and distinguishes the seventh century occurrence of Syāṃ as a proper name from the later geographic usage.

In the records of Zhou Daguan, a Chinese envoy who traveled to Angkor, the Siamese are noted as a separate group from the Khmer. People from Siam brought mulberry and silkworms to Angkor. The locals of Angkor hired these people from Siam to repair clothes.

There are also carvings of the "Syam Kuk" army on the walls of the Angkor Wat temple, with the inscription "Ne Syam Kuk" ("This Syam Kuk") and "Anak Rajakarya Bhak Paman Cheng Jhal Da Nam Syam Kuk" ("Military officials of Cheng Jhal city"). Modern scholarly consensus rejects the claim that “syām kuk” were the ethnic Siamese/Thai. Vickery writes that syam was a foreign geographic label denoting physical territory, not an ethnic name used by the locals. Vickery documents that Syam, Sien, Siam, and the Chinese Hsien were exclusively used by foreigners (Khmers, Cham, and Chinese) to describe the coastal river basin up to Lopburi of modern-day Thailand. As the Chinese word Hsien would later refer to the city of Ayutthaya, Syām corresponds to the southern, central plains of Thailand. Vickery points to a 1167 Pali and Khmer Nakon Sawan inscription showing a localized non-Angkorian, Khmer power center. In the 12th century, when the marching Syām Kuk was carved, this area was largely populated by the Mon-Khmer, not the Tai.

Following Jayavarman VII's death, the Khmer Empire experienced a gradual decline. Important factors were the neighboring peoples (Thai and Cham), chronic interdynastic strife, and the gradual deterioration of the complex irrigation system that had ensured rice surpluses. In the mid-13th century, the kingdom of Sukhothai was founded when a local Tai ruler declared independence from Khmer rule. It was a small local power until Ramkhamhaeng inherited control of the kingdom in 1279. During the 13th century, Thai people began to rise up, Jayavarman VIII suffered a devastating war against the Sukhothai Kingdom led by Si Inthrathit. The Angkorian era existed until 1431, when the Thai under Borommarachathirat II, captured Angkor Thom and the Cambodian king fled to the southern part of the country.

=== Longvek era ===
During the Longvek period, due to the low populations of Southeast Asian states, human labor was the most important resource. Invasions to capture prisoners were common. Early 15th century Khmer kings led an army to attack Chanthaburi and Bang Khang, taking prisoners and bringing them back to Chatomukh. Ponhea Yat also sent a raid to attack Chanthaburi. After the Ayutthaya capitulation to the Taungoo Dynasty, Baraminreachea and later Khmer kings launched many raids on Siam.

In relatiation for the attacks, King Naresuan of Ayutthaya ordered the invasion of Cambodia and captured many Khmer prisoners of war.

During the second fall of Ayutthaya, a large wave of Siamese refugees fled to Cambodia and the Principality of Hà Tiên. Later, King Taksin of Thonburi led an army into Hà Tiên and Cambodia in 1771 to eliminate all the Ayutthaya princes, nobles, and officials who had fled as they posed as potential threats to legitimacy since Taksin was considered a usurper.

=== Udong era ===
The establishment of Inner Cambodia, a region of primarily ethnic Khmers but ruled by Siamese lords brought many Siamese people to the region. Cities like Mongkol Borey, Serei Saophoan, Watthana Nakhon, Aranyaprathet, Battambang, and Siem Reap were settled by many Thais. Thai lords in the region built strong fortresses and city walls to consolidate the city.

There were also Siamese theatrical troupes that crossed over to perform on the Khmer side. Many skilled male and female actors entered the service of the Khmer court, and some became drama teachers. In a letter from Monsieur Wilmain to Monsieur Decourvière, it is stated that during 1785–1786, in the reign of King Rama I, Siam lost the war to Cambodia on January 18, leaving 500 Thai people and 16 converts stranded on the east bank of the Mekong River in Cambodian territory. In June of the same year, a number of Siamese soldiers deserted from Cambodia and returned to Bangkok.

However, a considerable number of Thais went into Cambodia voluntarily, for example, to work as officials, and many entered into service as royal consorts of the Cambodian king. In the Siamese and Cambodian courts, there were kinship ties through marriage, especially in the inner court of King Norodom, who was always familiar with life in the Siamese court

=== French Protectorate of Cambodia ===
After Cambodia became a point of power struggle between Thailand and Vietnam, King Norodom tried to prevent the two neighbors from taking over Cambodia by inviting France to make Cambodia its protectorate on 11 August 1863. Since then, Cambodia remained under France's rule until 9 November 1953.

=== World War II ===
In 1941, Thailand invaded French Indochina. After a brief conflict, a treaty was signed that forced France to give the western parts of Cambodia to Thailand. In 1946, following Allied victory in WWII, Thailand was forced to return these territories to France.

=== Cold War ===
In 1954, after French withdrawal, Thai military forces occupied the specific grounds of the Preah Vihear Temple in Cambodia and the surrounding "gray zones." They remained until a 1962 International Court of Justice (ICJ) ruling gave the temple to Cambodia.

During the 1970s, Khmer Rouge ruled Cambodia as Democratic Kampuchea carrying out the Cambodian genocide. This caused many Cambodian refugees fleeing to the Thai border to escape Pol Pot's regime.

On 1 January 1979, Vietnam invaded Kampuchea and removed Khmer Rouge from power replacing it with the Soviet-backed People's Republic of Kampuchea escalating into an eleven year war. Thailand refused to recognize the PRK and continued to support the deposed Democratic Kampuchea though Khmer Rouge and the two non-communist factions assembled the Kampuchean government-in-exile backed by the People's Republic of China, North Korea, ASEAN and the other Western powers. During that period, the Vietnamese soldiers attacked refugee camps near the Thai-Cambodian border over the course of its annual dry seasons.

By the time Communist regimes in Eastern Europe collapsed, Vietnam withdrew its troops from Cambodia in late 1989 leading up to the 1991 Paris Peace Accords which paved way for the restoration of monarchy in 1993. On 18 February 1994, Pol Pot and the Khmer Rouge had rebuilt their former jungle bases at the Dângrêk Range of Anlong Veng near the border with Thailand, which became the final headquarters for the Khmer Rouge members.

=== 21st century ===
In February 2025, Thai & Cambodian police raided a Poipet building, freeing 215 foreigners from multiple countries. Their various nationalities included 109 Thais, 50 Pakistanis, 48 Indians, 5 Taiwanese, and 3 Indonesians. This was the largest number of Thais ever freed from a suspected scam centre. South-East Asian scam centres have been operating for years, but faced increased scrutiny after a Chinese actor Wang Xing was lured to Thailand with a fake job offer, abducted, and then taken to a Myanmar scam center.

== Conflicts and disputes ==
=== 2003 riots ===
In January 2003, riots broke out in Phnom Penh after a Cambodian newspaper incorrectly reported that Thai actress Suvanant Kongying had stated Angkor Wat properly belonged to Thailand. On 29 January, the Thai embassy was burned, and hundreds of Thai immigrants fled the country to avoid the violence. Cambodians in Phnom Penh burned photos of King Bhumibol Adulyadej and Thais in Bangkok protested in front of the Cambodian embassy, burning Cambodian flags. This eventually led to the Thai government to sever diplomatic ties with Cambodia. Prime Minister Hun Sen banned Thai shows and films on TV stations.

=== 2008 border disputes ===
The conflict between Cambodia and Thailand over land adjoining the site has led to periodic outbreaks of violence.

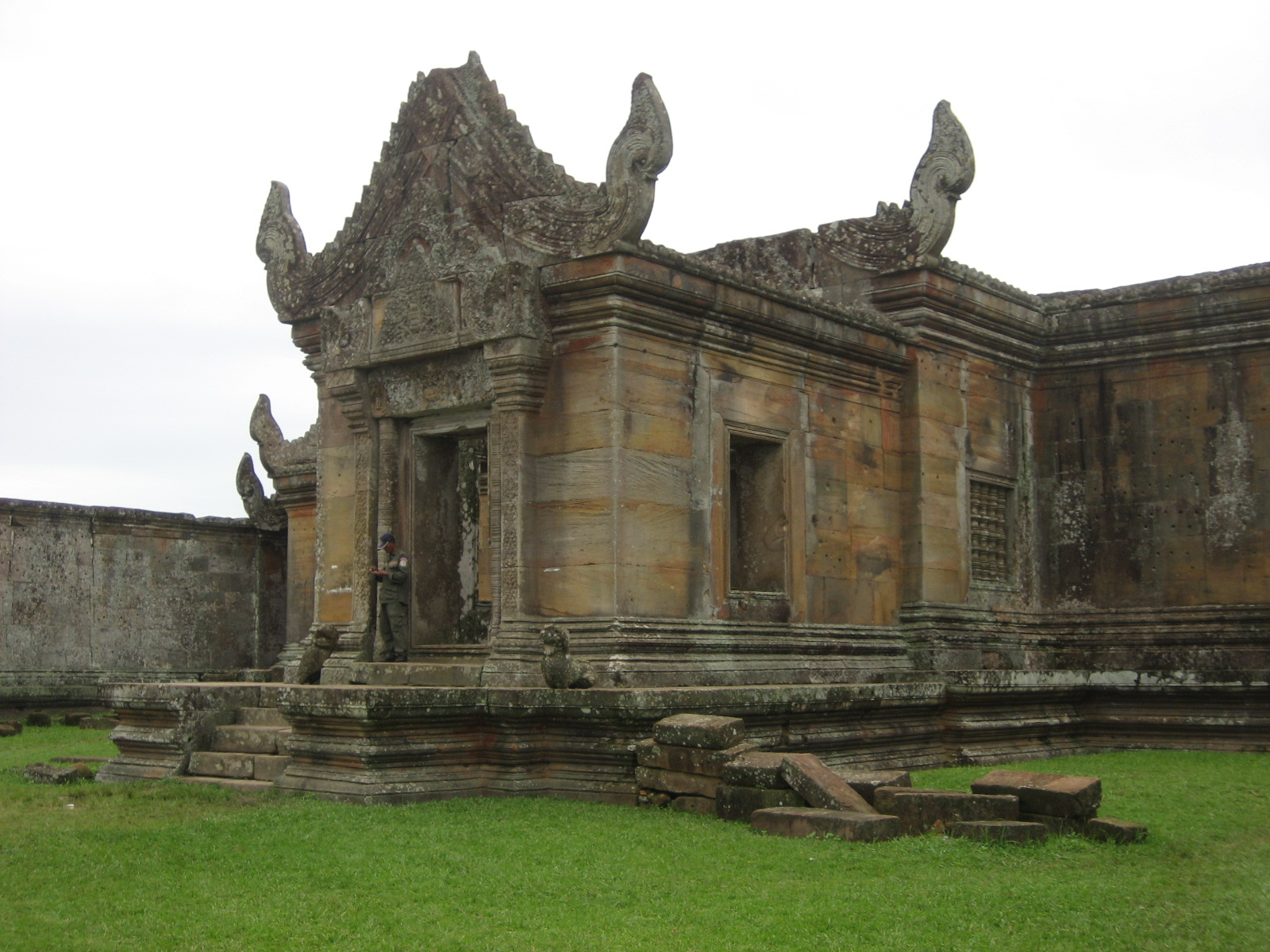
Preah Vihear

A military clash occurred in October 2008. In April 2009, 66 stones at the temple allegedly were damaged by Thai soldiers firing across the border. In February 2010, the Cambodian government filed a formal letter of complaint with Google Maps for depicting the natural watershed as the international border instead of the line shown on the 1907 French map used by the International Court of Justice in 1962.

In February 2011, when Thai officials were in Cambodia negotiating the dispute, Thai and Cambodian troops clashed, resulting in injuries and deaths on both sides. Artillery bombardment in the area occurred during the conflict. The Cambodian government has claimed that damage occurred to the temple. However, a UNESCO mission to the site to determine the extent of the damage indicates that the destruction is a result of both Cambodian and Thai gunfire.

Both sides shelled the other, and both blame the other for starting the violence. On 5 February 2011, Cambodia formally complained in a letter to the UN "The recent Thai military actions violate the 1991 Paris Peace Accord, U.N. Charter and a 1962 judgment from the International Court of Justice", the letter claims. On 6 February, the Cambodian government claimed that the temple had been damaged. Cambodia's military commander said: "A wing of our Preah Vihear temple has collapsed as a direct result of the Thai artillery bombardment". However, Thai sources spoke only of minor damage, claiming that Cambodian soldiers had fired from within the temple.

ASEAN, to which both states belong, offered to mediate the issue. However, Thailand has insisted that bilateral discussions could better solve the issue. On 5 February, the right-wing People's Alliance for Democracy called for the resignation of Prime Minister Abhisit Vejjajiva for "failing to defend the nation's sovereignty".

A UNESCO World Heritage convention held in Paris in June 2011 determined to accept Cambodia's management proposal for the temple. As a consequence, Thailand withdrew from the event, with the Thai representative explaining, "We withdraw to say we do not accept any decision from this meeting."

Following a February 2011 request from Cambodia for Thai military forces to be ordered out of the area, judges of the International Court of Justice (ICJ) by a vote of 11–5 ordered that both countries immediately withdraw their military forces, and further imposed restrictions on their police forces. The court said this order would not prejudice any final ruling on where the border in the area between Thailand and Cambodia should fall. Abhisit Vejjajiva said that Thai soldiers would not pull out from the disputed area until the military of both countries agreed on the mutual withdrawal. "[I]t depends on the two sides to come together and talk," he said, suggesting that an existing joint border committee would be the appropriate place to plan a coordinated pullback. The ICJ ruled on 11 November 2013 that the area around and below the temple belongs to Cambodia and that any Thai security forces still in that area must leave.

=== Cultural rivalry ===
As in the dispute over Preah Vihear, nationalist sentiments in both countries have also repeatedly contested other elements of Cambodia and Thailand's shared cultural heritage. From the 2010s, this has emerged as an online rivalry between their netizens over claims of ownership and origination of shared heritage, occasionally erupting as episodes of online outrage and flame wars when such heritage comes into the news spotlight. Major past incidents include arguments over the Lakhon Khol / khon traditional masked dance when they were being considered for inclusion on the UNESCO Intangible Cultural Heritage Lists in 2016, and the kun Khmer / muay Thai martial arts during the 2023 SEA Games.

Conservative Thais insist Angkor was built by a fabricated and extinct race called “Khom,” who were unrelated to today’s Khmers of Cambodia. Early Siamese kingdoms inherited culture not from the Khmers but from the Khom, they claim, while the Khmers in Cambodia are uncivilized and untrustworthy, and “stole” Thai culture like attire, dance, food, and martial arts. It’s their assertion that the disputed Hindu temples don’t belong to Cambodia, but the fabricated Khom. Despite being thoroughly debunked by experts for nearly a century, it’s popular with Thais on social media who cling to this Khom myth.

=== 2025 border conflict ===
On 28 May 2025, Cambodian and Thai soldiers exchanged fire between each near the Emerald Triangle, resulting in the death of one Cambodian soldier. Both nations accused each other of instigating the skirmish. On 19 June 2025, the Thai Ministry of Foreign Affairs summoned the Cambodian ambassador to Thailand and submitted a formal protest regarding the leaked recording, calling Cambodia's actions "a breach of diplomatic etiquette, a serious violation of trust, and undermines conduct between two neighboring countries." Thailand imposed border restrictions with Cambodia and Cambodia has banned Thai-produced films from TV.

As of 25 July 2025, the clashes between Thailand and Cambodia, which have killed at least 16 people and displaced tens of thousands of people in both countries, could “move towards war.”

Over 130,000 civilians in Thailand and around 38,000 in Cambodia have been reported displaced.

U.S. President Donald Trump brokered calls with both countries’ leaders between 26 and 27 July, demanding an immediate ceasefire and conditioning U.S. trade negotiations on halting hostilities. Cambodia agreed to "immediate and unconditional" cease‑fire talks; Thailand responded with cautious openness, urging Cambodia to show genuine commitment.

The Thai army has accused Cambodia of violating a newly agreed midnight ceasefire by launching armed attacks at several locations along their shared border, prompting Thai retaliatory responses and ongoing military negotiations, while Cambodia denies any breach of the truce. On 29 December 2025, Cambodia allegedly flew more than 250 drones into Thai territory; Thailand said the incursion violated the ceasefire agreement, just a day after both sides vowed to stop hostilities.

== See also ==
- Inner Cambodia
- Cambodia–Thailand border
- Cambodian–Thai border dispute
- Foreign relations of Cambodia
- Foreign relations of Thailand
