= Fall of Angkor =

1431 sack of the Khmer capital at Angkor

Date	1430–1431
Location	Angkor, Khmer Empire
Result	Ayutthayan troops loot Angkor; Ponhea Yat abandons Angkor and sets up court in Phnom Penh; Fall of the Khmer Empire, beginning of the Post-Angkor period

Belligerents
Ayutthaya Kingdom	Khmer Empire

Commanders and leaders
Borommarachathirat II	Ponhea Yat

The fall of Angkor (Khmer: ការដួលរលំនៃអង្គរ, Thai: การล่มสลายของอังกอร์), also known as the sack of Angkor or siege of Angkor or also Siamese occupation of Angkor, refers to the capture of the Khmer capital at Angkor by the Ayutthaya Kingdom, conventionally dated to 1431. Thai chronicle traditions describe a siege of Angkor Thom lasting around seven months, beginning in 1430 and ending with the city's capture in 1431.

In the aftermath, the Khmer court shifted its political centre southwards, with Ponhea Yat associated in later accounts with moves to Basan (Srey Santhor) and then to Chaktomuk (present-day Phnom Penh), a transition often used to mark the start of the Post-Angkor period. While Angkor ceased to function as the kingdom's main political capital, archaeological and inscriptional evidence indicates that major Angkorian temple sites continued to see occupation and religious use after the 15th century.

== Siamese–Khmer conflicts ==
=== First Siamese occupation (1352–1357) ===
Map of Southeast Asia in 1300AD

In 1351, during the reign of the Khmer King Lompong Reachea, the Siamese King Uthong established the Ayutthaya Kingdom and sent his army to attack the Khmer. The Siamese army surrounded the city for almost one year and five months. Many Khmer reinforcements were raised from various places, but they were uneven and were defeated. The King Lompong Reachea also died of illness. At that time, Khmer prince Soryavong and the royal teacher Purohit brought the royal equipment, broke through the Siamese army's defence and fled. However, the capital of Angkor fell into the hands of the Siamese in 1352.

After anointing the Siamese prince Basat to reign in Angkor and appointing a Siamese governor to control the Khmer provinces in the west that he had captured during his invasion of Angkor, King Uthong returned to Ayutthaya, taking many of his subjects as prisoners and transporting much of his wealth. King Uthong's three sons, Basat, Baat, and Kamban Pisey, reigned in succession in Angkor from 1352 to 1357. In 1357, Khmer prince Soryavong, who had fled to Laos five years ago, led an army to recapture Angkor. The Khmer then drove the Siamese out from the western part of the Khmer kingdom, and Soryavong ascended the throne.

=== Second Siamese occupation (1393–1394) ===
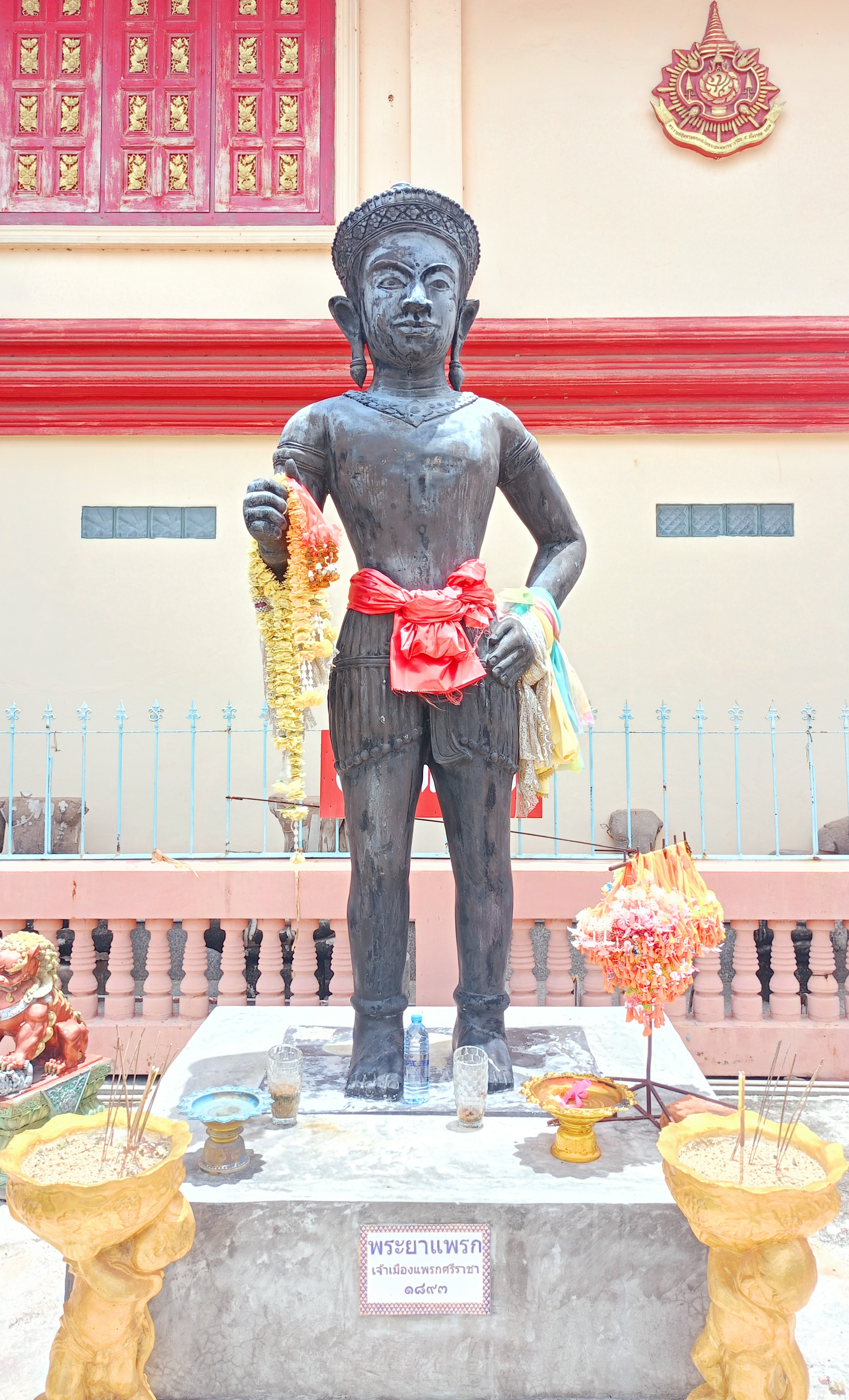
Ponhea Prek Statue in Thailand

The king who reigned Khmer in 1393 was Thomma Saok. At that time, Ramesuan was the King of Siam and continued the policy of annexing the territory of Cambodia. Angkor was besieged and occupied again in 1393, when King Thomma Saok also died. The Siamese king anointed his son, Ponhea Prek, as the vassal king in 1394, and transported the wealth and 70,000 Cambodian captives back to Ayutthaya.

By then, Khmer prince Ponhea Yat had fled and gone to lead an army based in Srey Santhor. The national liberation movement led by this prince was growing rapidly. Five months later, the Khmer army was able to recapture Angkor. Ponhea Prek was also killed by Ponhea Yat. After liberating the capital, Ponhea Yat ascended the throne with the title Raja Aungkar Preah Paramrajathiraj.

=== Fall of Angkor (1431) ===
In 1431, Angkor was conquered by Siamese King Borommarachathirat II. Khmer King Ponhea Yat was forced to flee Yasodharapura as it was indefensible against attack by the Siamese. Ponhea Yat first resettled in Basan (Srey Santhor), but after it became flooded, he fled to Chaktomuk (now part of Phnom Penh).

== Factors ==
There continues to be some debate over the fall of Angkor. The fall of Angkor has been attributed to a variety of factors, of both human and natural origin.

=== Human factors ===
==== Military defeat ====
The main reason for the fall of Angkor, especially according to Thai historians, is the Suphannaphum dynasty attack in 1431, which caused the Khmer to abandon Angkor and to retreat south-eastwards.

Some believe that Champa warriors from Southeast Asia may have sacked the city for its wealth.

==== Collapse of the hydraulic city ====
Command of water played an important role in the rise and fall of Angkor, and scholars using satellite technology are only now beginning to fathom the true size and achievement of medieval Khmer society. Once abandoned after the reign of Suryavarman II, stagnating reservoirs attracting mosquitoes may have been the cause spreading malaria as this was also the period in which this disease was introduced in Southeast Asia.

Groslier argues the fall of Angkor was partly brought on by an imbalance in the ecosystem that was caused by the extension of irrigated rice fields and hydraulic cities into formerly forested land in Cambodia, and was therefore an ecological crisis induced by mankind.

A more Malthusian argument that with excessive population growth, Angkor was unable to feed its own population which led to social unrest and eventually societal collapse.

==== Crisis of faith ====
Some scholars have connected the decline of Angkor with the conversion of the Khmer Empire to Theravada Buddhism following the reign of Jayavarman VII, arguing that this religious transition eroded the Hindu concept of kingship that underpinned the Angkorian civilization. According to Angkor scholar George Coedès, Theravada Buddhism's denial of the ultimate reality of the individual served to sap the vitality of the royal personality cult which had provided the inspiration for the grand monuments of Angkor. The vast expanse of temples required an equally large body of workers to maintain them; at Ta Prohm, a stone carving states that 12,640 people serviced that single temple complex. Not only could the spread of Buddhism have eroded this workforce, but it could have also affected the estimated 300,000 agricultural workers required to feed all of them.

On the other hand, a new religious fervor was growing among the Siamese who came to believe that they had the moral authority as well as the self-confidence and the public support to challenge Khmer rule as the moral order of Angkor declined.

=== Natural factors ===
==== Southeast Asian drought of the early 1400s ====
Southeast Asia suffered a severe drought in the early 1400s. The East Asian summer monsoon became very fickle in the decades leading up to the fall of Angkor in the fifteenth century. Brendan Buckley suggests this drought dried out Angkor's reservoirs and canals, which in turn, led to its precipitous decline and foreign invasion.

==== Climate change ====
Climate change may have been another factor in the fall of Angkor which happened during the transition from the Medieval Warm Period to the Little Ice Age. The fall of Angkor was an "impressive illustration for failure to interact successfully with hydrological extremes".

== Aftermath ==
=== Angkor fallen, but not abandoned ===
Contrary to the popular idea that ancient temple complexes had been abandoned after the fall of Angkor, many important sites remained in use, although now they were rededicated to Theravada Buddhism. After the fall of Angkor in the fifteenth century and the permanent removal of the capital to the south, Khmer royalty repeatedly returned to Angkor's temples, paying their respects to gods and ancestors, restoring old statues and erecting new ones, as can be seen from the Grande Inscription d'Angkor and even to this day, with "unflagging assiduity".

=== Moving out of Angkor into the Middle period ===
After the fall of Angkor, Cambodian history can be characterized as a declining state because of the limited information.

=== A literary downfall ===
Because of Cambodia's troubles following the fall of Angkor, no Cambodian literature survives that can be precisely dated to the 15th or 16th centuries. While it had been the main language in Khmer inscriptions, Sanskrit was abandoned and replaced by Middle Khmer, showing borrowings from Thai, Lao and to a lesser extent, Vietnamese.

== See also ==
- Siamese-Cambodian War (1591-1594)
- Fall of Longvek
- Fall of Phnom Penh
- Post-Angkor Period
