= Baraminreachea =

King of Cambodia

Barom reachea

King of Cambodia
- Reign: 1566–1576
- Coronation: 1558
- Predecessor: Ang Chan I
- Successor: Satha I
- Born: 1521; Pursat, Cambodia
- Died: 1576 (aged 55); Longvek, Cambodia
- Spouse: Tevi; Tep Bopha; Mali; Kesar Mealea; Van
- Issue: Prince Satha I Prince Soriyopear; Ponhea Nour; Ponhea An
- House: Varman Dynasty
- Father: Ang Chan I Reachea
- Mother: Botum Bopha
- Religion: Buddhism

Baraminreachea (Khmer: បរមិន្ទរាជា, Paramindarājā; 1521–1576) was the Cambodian king who reigned from 1566 to 1576.

Baraminreachea was the second son of Ang Chan I. During his reign, Siam was at war with Burma. Since 1569, Burmese occupied the Siamese capital Ayuttaya for fifteen years. Seizing the opportunity, Cambodia launched a counter-offensive against Siam. Cambodian army recaptured the northwest provinces, and moved the capital back to Angkor in 1570.

== First Cambodian invasion of Srei Ayutthaya (1570) ==
In 1570, when King Baraminreachea was preparing to attack the city of Ayutthaya, the Annam had also been attacking the Cham territory. Therefore, he sent 30,000 soldiers to defend the city of Prey Nokor. Thus, the army that was preparing to attack Ayutthaya, 70,000 soldiers, was reduced to only 40,000.

=== Cambodian invasion of Srei Ayutthaya (1570) ===
King Baraminreachea sent his army commander, Champadhiraja, to attack the city of Ayutthaya with 40,000 soldiers. Because Ayutthaya was surrounded by water, the army could not cross. Champadhiraja ordered the navy to deploy 100 boats carrying 7,000 soldiers to attack Ayutthaya and split the army. Another part, led by the deputy commander, Naem Ratana, deployed 15 boats carrying 4,000 soldiers to attack the Chao Sanok area, which was on the other side of Ayutthaya. He ordered them to build bamboo rafts, set up cannons to fire from the water, and attack Ayutthaya at once. The Laotian army entered the battle, and the Siamese army, from morning until noon, still could not break through Ayutthaya. The Siamese King Maha Thammaracha ordered the army to turn the cannons and destroy the Khmer rafts that were equipped with cannons, destroying them completely. The Cambodian army withdrew to the other side, preparing to attack the city of Ayutthaya on the other side for the second time. The second battle, led by the Khmer general Naman Busracha, raised more than 10,000 more naval forces to attack the city of Ayutthaya for the second time. When they reached the other side, they found the Tangoo army of Hanthawaddy kingdom, who had placed cannons on the backs of elephants and fired at the Cambodian army, unable to transfer the army to the other side. The Cambodian army retreated for the second time. Because the city of Ayutthaya was surrounded by water, making it difficult for the Cambodian army to attack, King Baraminreachea ordered the construction of a tower with cannons on one side and the Cambodian army to seize the wealth of the Siamese villages by seizing elephants, horses, cows, buffaloes, and many foods to send to Longvek. The Cambodian army fought the Siamese army for a whole month, still unable to capture the city of Ayutthaya, so King Baraminreachea announced the withdrawal of the army and announced that he would personally lead the Cambodian army to attack Siam again.

== Cambodian-Laotian War (1572) ==
In 1571 AD, when the Laotian king Setthathirath of Lan Xang saw that the king of the Cambodia kingdom had greatly expanded his military influence in the region, in order to counter Cambodia's expansion of its territory, the Lao king invited King Baraminreachea to compete in elephant fights, pay tribute as a gift, and sign a treaty to divide the kingdom into several parts. The Laotian elephant wrestling bet was approved by the Cambodian king. The Laotian king sent an envoy and more than 1,000 officials to bring the Lan Xang elephant, which was 8 cubits tall (4m), to compete with the Khmer elephant, named Kachvehar, which was 7 cubits tall (3.5m). The wrestling was held in Asantuk District (Now Kampong Thom ). The wrestling was successful because the Khmer elephant was shorter, so it could dive under the Laotian elephant and use its tusks to stab its lower body until the Laotian elephant lost. The Laotian king also agreed to pay a large tribute to the Khmer kingdom. The Laotian king could not bear the humiliation of losing the wrestling bet against the Khmer kingdom, so he decided to raise the Laotian army to attack Cambodia.

=== Cambodian-Laotian War (1572) ===
In 1572, the Lao king, Srey Setthathirath, led a Lao army of 150,000 to invade Cambodia. The first army consisted of 100,000 land troops, accompanied by 500 war elephants and 1,200 cavalry, while the second army consisted of 50,000 naval troops traveling down the Mekong River . Seeing that the Lao king was sending a large army to invade Cambodia, King Baraminreachea ordered the general Udayathirat to lead 100,000 troops to prepare for war with the Lao. The Lao navy of 50,000 arrived in Sambor District, Kratie Province, and fought against the Cambodian navy of 30,000, while another 70,000 Cambodian troops, plus 300 war elephants and 800 cavalry, prepared to defend the fort in Asantuk District (Now Kampong Thom ). 100,000 Laotian troops attacked the Khmer fortress. Both armies used artillery to fire at each other. Many soldiers died. The Laotian king ordered the use of chariots and elephants to attack the Cambodian army in succession. The Cambodian army could not resist and broke up and fled the fortress to meet the Luang army of the King. He brought in 100,000 additional reinforcements from Longvek and ordered the army to set fire to create smoke throughout the forest to distract the Laotian army. He also ordered his troops to spread out in the forest to surround the Laotian army at night. At dawn, the Cambodian army, led by Panya Dhamma Techo, attacked the Lao army from the rear. The sound of the Cambodian army's drums and drums began to attack the Laotian army from all directions. When the Lao king learned that the Cambodian army was surrounding his army, he announced a retreat and broke out of the siege. The Cambodian army was victorious and captured approximately 10,000 Lao soldiers. The Laotian king withdrew and was pursued by the Khmer army, moving the border and taking some districts in the north, such as: Attapeu, Champasak and Pakxe. The area through which the Laotian army fled from the O'Alai area of Stung Treng province is called Lao Bak Thu to this day.

== Second Cambodian invasion of Ayutthaya (1574) ==
When the king Baraminreachea heard that Siam was now occupied by the Burmese, whose king was named "Bayinnaung" of the Toungoo kingdom, who had swallowed up four states: Hanthawaddy Kingdom, Ava Kingdom, Sukhothai Kingdom, and Ayutthaya Kingdom, and had also sent a large army to swallow up the kingdom of Laos.

=== Second Cambodian invasion of Ayyuthaya (1574) ===
in 1574 AD, king Baraminreachea gathered 130,000 Cambodian troops ready to wage war against the Pegu of Burma to reclaim the western lands. The Cambodian army gathered in Chan Borei. king Baraminreachea divided his army into five divisions. The first division, a naval force led by Chao Panya Chin, numbered 20,000, went to attack Thonburi, while the other four divisions gathered in Samut Prakan to prepare to attack the capital of Ayutthaya again. The news of the gathering of more than 100,000 Cambodian troops to attack the capital of Ayutthaya reached the king of Ayutthaya, Naresuan, who declared the border closed and sent an envoy to deliver a message to the Cambodian king to negotiate an end to the war. The message stated that the Ayutthaya King agreed to pay tribute every year and to divide the border from Chanburi, Paschimburi, Nakhon Ratchasima, and Kok Khan to be given to Cambodia up to the border of Lan Xang. Therefore, the Cambodian king agreed to this proposal and withdrew the Cambodian troops.

Baraminreachea Varman Dynasty Born: 1521 Died: 1576
Regnal titles
Preceded by Ang Chan I	King of Cambodia; 1566–1576	Succeeded by Satha I
