= Preah Ram II =

King of Cambodia

King of Cambodia
- Reign: 1596–1597
- Predecessor: Preah Ram I
- Successor: Barom Reachea II
- Died: 1597; Cambodia

Preah Ram II (died 1597), also known as Ram II Cau Ban Sur, was the Cambodian king who ruled from 1596 to 1597. He was an usurper.

Preah Ram II was a son-in-law of Preah Ram I. He seized power after the death of his predecessor. He was assassinated in March (or April) 1597 by a rebel named Kaev Brah Bhloen, who proclaimed himself king in Phnom Penh.

Learning about the death of Preah Ram II, the Spaniards attacked Cambodia and crowned Barom Reachea II as king in May 1597.

== See also ==
- Cambodian–Spanish War

Preah Ram II Varman Dynasty Born: ? Died: 1597
Regnal titles
Preceded by Preah Ram I	King of Cambodia; 1596–1597	Succeeded by Barom Reachea II
