= Diogo Veloso =

Portuguese adventurer

Diogo Veloso, or Diego Belloso in the Spanish historical accounts (1558 – 1599), was a Portuguese adventurer active in Southeast Asia in the last quarter of the 16th century, acting sometimes in the service of the Spanish Governor of the Spanish East Indies during the Cambodian–Spanish War and sometimes as a freelancer. He and the Spanish explorer Blas Ruiz were the first Europeans to ever set foot in Laos.

Veloso's journey to Laos started in Cambodia, where he met and befriended King Satha of Lovek and Ruiz of Spain. When Lovek was invaded by Ayutthaya, Satha was overthrown by his son and other nobles who allowed Ayutthaya to take control, forcing Veloso to flee to Portuguese Malacca, the place where he began his adventure in Southeast Asia. Eventually Veloso returned with Ruiz, who had fled to Spanish Philippines, to Lovek. When they arrived they learned Satha had fled to Lan Xang, an empire centered in modern-day Laos and consisting of Isan, Stung Treng, and small areas of Southern China and Vietnam.

Veloso and Ruiz decided to journey to Laos and bring back Satha to restore his reign over Lovek. They arrived in Vientiane, Lan Xang's administrative capital, in the summer of 1596. They were met with a procession showing off the city's immense wealth consisting of Asian elephants, gold, jewels, silk, exotic snakes, bouquets of tropical flowers, chanting monks, Buddhist treasures and relics, music, and beautiful women. Veloso and Ruiz were also received with a great feast. But while they were in Vientiane they learned Satha had died from an illness he caught on his way from Cambodia to Laos. Saddened and angered by the news, Veloso and Ruiz returned to Lovek and started a rebellion to put one of Satha's political allies on the throne and free Cambodia from Ayutthaya. They managed to drive out Ayutthaya forces from parts of Cambodia and create a new state but led the new Cambodian state into a brief period of chaos.

Eventually Veloso returned to Malacca.

== Bibliography ==
- Morga, Antonio De (2009). The Philippine Islands, Moluccas, Siam, Cambodia, Japan, and China. Applewood Books. ISBN 978-1429091398.

== See also ==
- Cambodian–Spanish War
- Spanish protectorate in Cambodia
- Pedro Ordóñez de Ceballos
- Antonio de Morga
- Spanish East Indies
- Portuguese discoveries
