= Satha I =

King of Cambodia

Satha I សត្ថាទី១

King of Cambodia
- Reign: 1576–1584
- Predecessor: Barom Reachea I
- Successor: Chey Chettha I Preah Ram I (usurper)
- Born: 1539; Cambodia
- Died: 1596 (aged 56–57); Vientiane, Lan Xang
- Spouse: Chakrapati
- Issue: Chey Chettha I Srei Soriyopear; Kaev Hua I
Names
- Brhat Pada Samdach Sdach Brhat Rajankariya Brhat Mahindra Rajadhiraja Ramadipati Sri Suriya Varman Maha Chakrapati Varman Naranga Ridhi Sanditya Isvara Kambul Krung Kambuja Adipati Sri Sudhara Pawara Indrapada Gururatta Rajadhaniya Tissarana Naya Mahayana Jathi Brhat Paramanatha Parama Bupati Jaya Amachas
- House: Varman Dynasty
- Father: Barom Reachea I
- Mother: Maha Kalyanavati Sri Sujata Uttama
- Religion: Buddhism

Satha I (also spelled Sattha; Khmer: សត្ថាទី១; 1539–1596), also known as Barom Reachea IV, was the Cambodian king ruled from 1576 to 1584. He was the eldest son of Barom Reachea III.

== History ==
During his reign, Blas Ruiz and Diogo Veloso came to Cambodia, both were trusted by the king and married Cambodian princesses.

Two inscriptions in Angkor Wat indicated that some temples were restorated with the help of the royal family in 1577–1578. Satha I abdicated in favor of his son Chey Chettha I in 1584.

Siamese had recovered their capital from the Burmese, and started to take revenge on Cambodia. In 1594, the Cambodian capital Lovek was under siege. Ruiz and Veloso were sent to Manila for assistance. Before they returned, the capital was sacked by Siamese. Satha was forced to flee and seek refuge in Lan Xang. He later died in Vientiane.

== In popular culture ==
He was portrayed as a character in the Thai television dramas King Naresuan 1987 (สมเด็จพระนเรศวรมหาราช ปี 2530) and Maharat kupandin (มหาราชกู้แผ่นดิน) or Athi raja (อธิราชา) 2003 and is an important character in Thai filmsKing Naresuan The Great, Part III, Naval Battle and Part IV, The Nanda Bayin War Portrayed by Setha Sirachaya.

Satha I Varman Dynasty Born: 1539 Died: 1596
Regnal titles
Preceded by Barom Reachea I	King of Cambodia; 1576–1584	Succeeded by Chey Chettha I Preah Ram I
