= Siamese–Cambodian War (1591–1594) =

Late 16th-century conflict between Siam and Cambodia

- Part of Cambodian–Spanish War
Date	1591 – 3 January 1594
Location	Cambodia
Result	Siamese victory: Later Preah Ram I leds the army to retake the capital

Belligerents
Ayutthaya Kingdom	Longvek Kingdom

Commanders and leaders
Naresuan; Ekathotsarot; Phra Ratcha Manoo	Satha I Chey Chettha I Soryopor (POW)

Units involved
Siamese armed; Royal Siamese armed forces	Cambodian armed; Longvek armed forces

Strength
100,000 troops	75,000 troops 150 junks 1,000 defenders

Casualties and losses
Approximately 30,000 soldiers killed by disease and hunger	90,000 Cambodian civilians taken hostage to Ayutthaya

The Siamese–Cambodian War (1591–1594) (Khmer: សង្គ្រាមសៀម-កម្ពុជា (១៥៩១-១៥៩៤); Thai: สงครามสยาม-กัมพูชา พ.ศ. 2134), also known as The Siamese Invasion of Longvek, was a military conflict fought between the Ayutthaya Kingdom and the Kingdom of Cambodia. The war began in 1591 when Ayutthaya invaded Cambodia in response to continuous Khmer raids into their territory. The Kingdom of Cambodia was also facing religious disagreements within the country. This gave the Siamese a perfect opportunity to invade. The first invasion was interrupted before it achieved its goals. The Ayutthayan king Naresuan returned two years later, eventually subjugating the whole country and finally sacking the Cambodian capital of Longvek on 3 January 1594.

== Background ==
Prince Naret, also known as the "Black Prince" (Thai: พระองค์ดำ), was born in the city of Phitsanulok on 25 April 1555. He was the son of Phitsanulok regent Mahathammarachathirat and his queen consort, Wisutkasat. His mother was a daughter of Maha Chakkraphat and queen consort Suriyothai. His father was a Sukhothai noble who had defeated Worawongsathirat in 1548 and put Maha Chakkraphat on the Ayutthaya throne, thus receiving the regency of Phitsanulok.

During the course of the second Burmese–Siamese War, Burmese king Bayinnaung took Phitsanulok and made the Sukhothai Kingdom a Burmese tributary state. Naret was then sent to Bago, Burma as a hostage to ensure the king's fidelity. Following the Burmese–Siamese War (1568–1570) the Burmese completely subjugated Ayutthaya, installing Mahathammarachathirat as their vassal and shortly releasing Naret in exchange for his sister. In 1571, Mahathammarachathirat bestowed Naret with the title of Uparaja of Phitsanulok, changing his name into Naresuan.

In 1581, Nanda Bayin succeeded his father Bayinnaung to the Burmese throne. Nanda Bayin became suspicious of Naresuan after the latter failed to make a timely arrival during the suppression of the Ava Revolt. Nanda Bayin then ordered two Mon generals to assassinate Naresuan during an upcoming battle. The Mons however immediately confided to Naresuan about their mission, as they considered Burmese rule to be oppressive. Naresuan renounced his pledge of allegiance to Burma and reestablished Ayutthaya as an independent kingdom. After repatriating 10,000 Thais from Pegu and receiving the support of numerous Shan immigrants, Naresuan was able to repel four large-scale Burmese invasions between 1584 and 1590.

Having cemented his control over the western border, Naresuan turned his attention to Cambodia. Ayutthaya and Cambodia had fought each other on numerous occasions since at least 1350. Cambodia had however entered a state of decline since the collapse of the Khmer Empire and limited its offensive operations to raids. Such raids took place during the first four Burmese–Siamese wars, targeting Petchaburi, Prachinburi, Chantaburi, Nakhon Ratchasima, Nontaburi, Phra Pradaeng, and the city of Ayutthaya. The raids were characterized by forced population transfers aimed at repopulating Cambodia.

== History ==
=== Conflict ===
The first campaign against Cambodia was launched in 1591, when the Siamese under general Phra Ratcha Manoo invaded through the Phra Charuk passage. Cambodian king Satha dispatched armies to Pursat and Battambang while also preparing an ambush in the Ranam forest. Despite initial success, the Cambodians were eventually driven out of Ranam after Thai reinforcements launched a second assault on the position. Pursat and Battambang soon fell into Thai hands, while the Longvek citadel became besieged. The siege lasted for three months, after which a combination of logistical issues and Cambodian counterattacks forced the Thais to retreat beyond the border.

After warding off another Burmese invasion in 1593, Naresuan divided his army into four columns in preparation for another assault on Cambodia. The first column assembled in Nakhon Ratchasima, while aiming to attack Siem Reap and Kampong Svay. The second column was to amass recruits from the south of Ayutthaya and then march on Moat Chruk (present-day Long Xuyen). The third army moved on Banteay Meas, while the fourth army once more targeted Pursat and Battanbang. The four armies would then be able to simultaneously strike the already surrounded Longvek. The Cambodians had in turn assembled a force of 75,000 men and 150 junks that occupied key positions in Babaur, Battambang, Pursat, Banteay Meas, and Phnom Penh. Siamese scouts managed to detain a number of Cambodian soldiers who upon interrogation revealed the positions of their comrades. The newly-acquired information facilitated the fall of Battambang.

A second battle fought in front of Pursat ended in defeat for the Cambodians, who were outflanked during the course of the battle. Three days later, the Siamese forces reached Babaur and began digging trenches around the city. By dusk Siamese sappers had mined their way up to the city's walls, thus initiating hand-to-hand combat. Cambodian prince Soryopor managed to fight his way out of the encirclement with 1,000 men while the rest of the defenders perished in the fighting. After reaching Longvek, Soryopor assumed direct command of the defenses as his brother Chey Chettha had by that time abandoned the city. Assisted by Spanish and Portuguese mercenaries Soryopor reinforced the walls with cannons and spikes, while also requesting assistance from Vietnam and the Spanish governor of Manila.

== Battle of Longvek ==
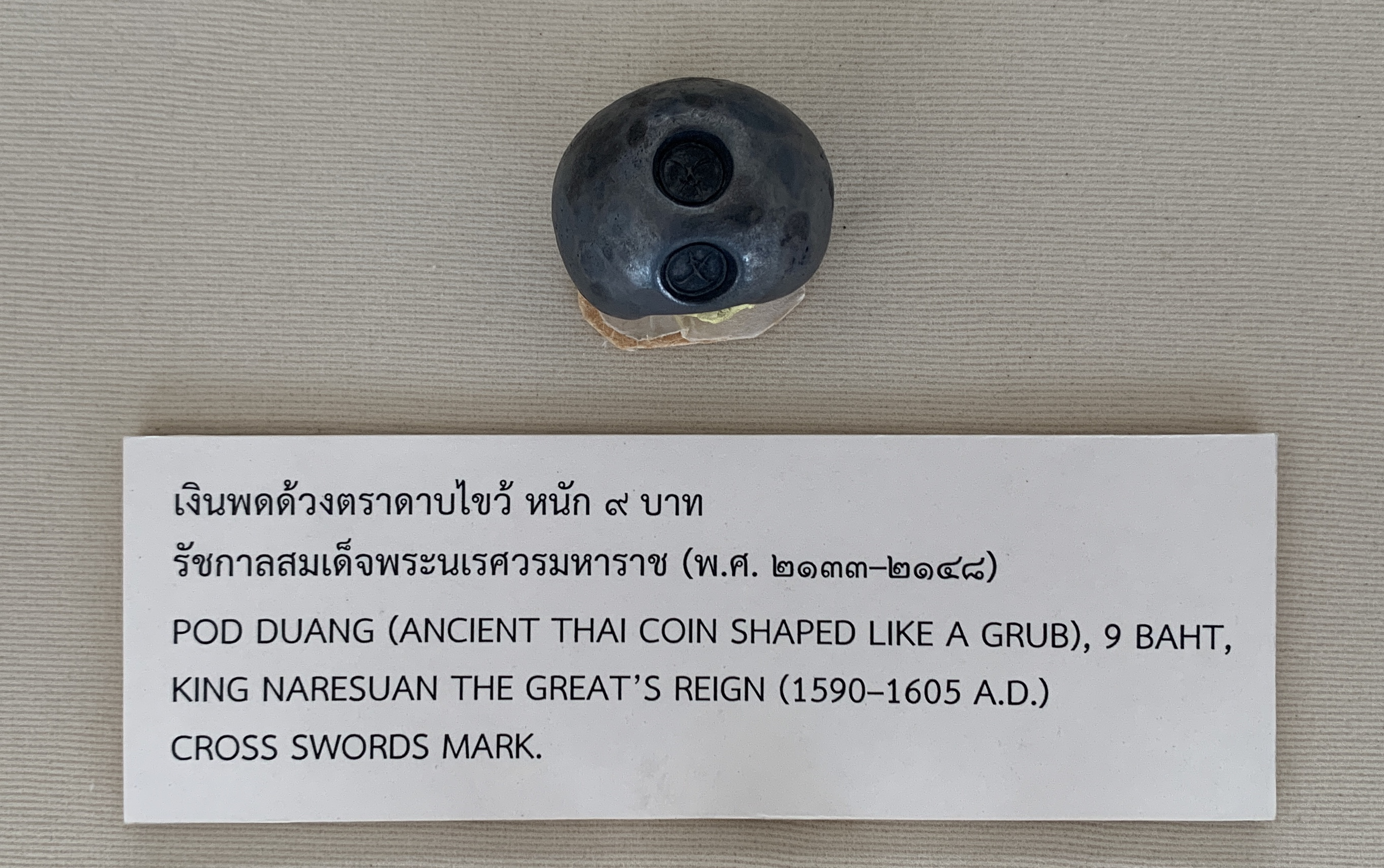
Naresuan era Pod Duang (1590–1605) Used 5000 package Shoot out all over the bamboo forest the wall of Longvek 1591, 16th century.

After Siamese army Destroying Cambodian Army in Many Provinces, Cambodian Prince Soriyopear Retreated to the fortress of Longvek. The large Siamese army, led by King Naresuan, advanced toward the fortress of Longvek and attempted to capture it. A week later, the Siamese army was infected with cholera, which spread throughout the army camp, causing the Siamese army to die from the disease, about 30,000 died and only 60,000 Siamese soldiers remained. Even Naresuan, the Siamese king himself, was seriously ill. Hearing this news, Soriyopear withdrew 75,000 troops, divided the army into three groups, and surrounded the Siamese army camp at Babaur. The Siamese army, which was weakening, could not withstand the battle with the Khmer army and was defeated, and retreated to Ayutthaya.

== Siege of Longvek (1594) ==
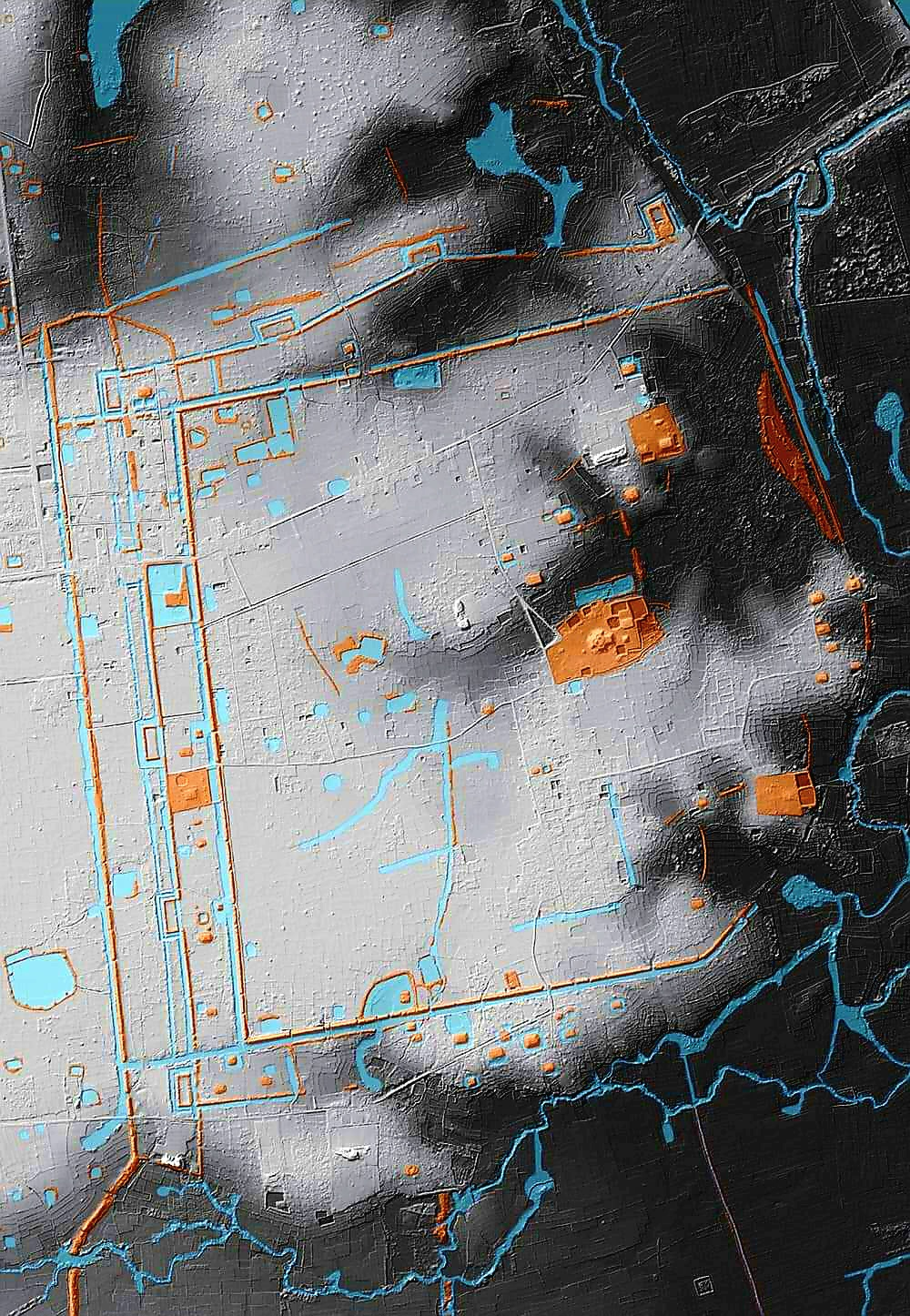
longvek real map.

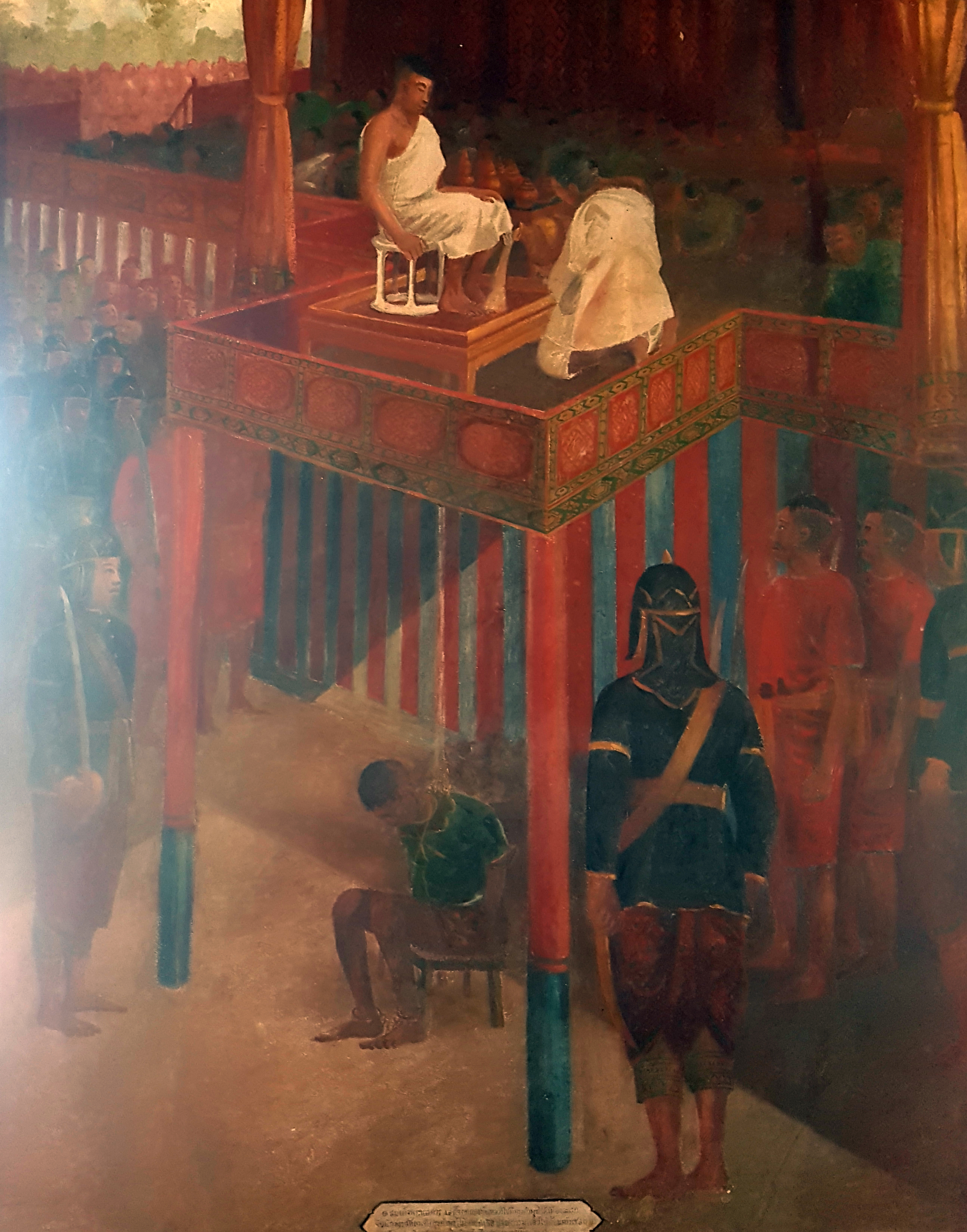
Paintings in Wat Suwandararam in depict Naresuan the king of Ayutthaya subjecting Satha I to a humiliating ritual before beheading him. Whether or not this event actually took place is disputed amongst modern scholars.

In the meantime the Cambodian navy was overpowered outside Moat Chruk, as the Siamese armies slowly converged on Longvek. Siamese engineers began the siege by erecting earthworks that surpassed the city's fortifications in height, thus enabling them to fire directly at the city. The Cambodians responded by building a second wall that shielded the city from bombardment. On 3 January 1594, following an hour long artillery preparation, Naresuan's army stormed the city. Siamese war elephants went on to break the city gates, allowing the infantry to penetrate the inner walls and slay the remnants of the garrison. Although King Satha managed to escape into neighboring Laos, 90,000 Cambodians Civilians, including Prince Soryopor, were taken to Ayutthaya.

== Aftermath ==
Following the Siam capture of the capital at Longvek, Cambodian royals were taken hostage and relocated to the court of Ayutthaya, kept under permanent Siamese influence, and left to compromise and out-compete each other under the overlord's scrutiny.

=== Casualties ===
In the Battle of Longvek, also mentioned "the Siamese army was infected with cholera, which spread throughout the army camp after attempted to Destroy The Fort of Longvek, causing the Siamese army to die from the disease, about 30,000 died and only 60,000 Siamese soldiers remained." According to some Cambodian sources.

After three months of siege, the fall of Longvek was a victory by surrender rather than a bloodshed. The deportation of 90,000 Cambodian elites to Siam. As such, it was the final defeat inflicted by the Siamese on the Khmer kingdom, and it had a lasting effect on Khmer pride. The pride is never restored since then.

The capture and destruction of Longvek in 1594 by King Naresuan of Ayutthaya were cataclysmic.

== See also ==
- History of Cambodia
- History of Thailand
- Post-Angkor Period
- Cambodia–Thailand relations
- Cambodian–Spanish War
- Cambodian-Dutch War
- Khmer–Cham wars
- Fall of Longvek
- Fall of Angkor
- Burmese–Siamese War (1584–1593)
