= Chey Chettha I =

King of Cambodia

King of Cambodia
- Reign: 1587–1595
- Predecessor: Satha I
- Successor: Preah Ram I (usurper)
- Born: 1575; Cambodia
- Died: 1595 (aged 19–20); Stung Treng
Names
- Samdach Brhat Maha Upasaka Maharaja Bupati Brhat Rajankariya Brhat Jaya Jathadhiraja Ramadipati Parama Bupati
- House: Varman Dynasty
- Father: Satha I
- Mother: Queen Chakrapati
- Religion: Roman Catholicism

Chey Chettha I (Khmer: ព្រះបាទជ័យជេដ្ឋាទី១, Jayajeṭṭhā I; 1575–1595) was a king of Cambodia who ruled from 1587 to 1595.

== History ==
Chey Chettha was the second son of Satha I. He was appointed as heir apparent when he was eleven. He was crowned by his father in 1584.

In 1594, Cambodia was attacked by Siam. After the Siamese army reached Lovek, Chey Chettha assumed his uncle Soryopor the direct command of the defenses.

Chey Chetta fled the capital with his father, Satha, first to Srey Santhor, then to Stung Treng. He died there in 1595 without an heir.

== See also ==
- Siamese–Cambodian War (1591–1594)
- Preah Ram I

Chey Chettha I Varman Dynasty Born: 1575 Died: 1595
Regnal titles
Preceded by Satha I	King of Cambodia; 1584–1595	Succeeded by Preah Ram I
