= Longvek =

Former capital of Cambodia

Coordinates: 11°51′53″N 104°45′14″E

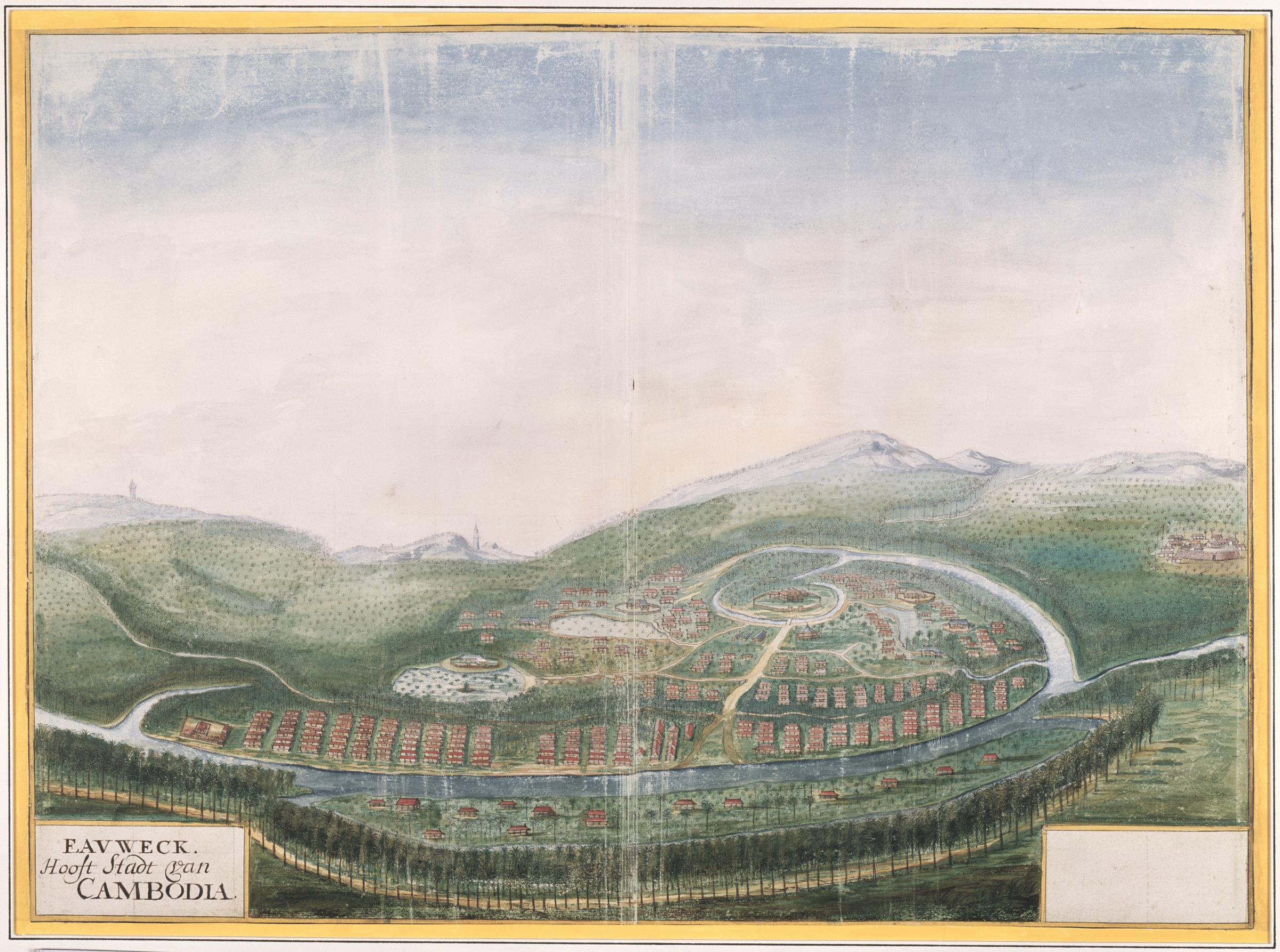
Bird's eye view of Longvek, Cambodia

Longvek or Lavek (Note: Variations of the name include: Lvek, Laṅvēka, Luṅvēka, Lovek, and Eauweck.) (Khmer: លង្វែក, pronounced [luŋˈʋɛːk] or ល្វែក, pronounced [lʋɛːk]; lit. 'Intersection or Crossroads') was a city in Cambodia. It was the second capital city during the Cambodia's post-Angkor period which began after the Angkor era. The city was one of the greatest cosmopolitan centers of Southeast Asia during the 16th century and became an international destination for foreign travelers. The city was known to early European traders as "Cambodia". It was a gathering point for people of knowledge including scholars and martial artists.

Longvek was chosen by King Ang Chan I after the sacking of Angkor by the Siamese as a new capital because of its more readily defensible terrain. As a result, there was a time when Cambodia was often referred to as Longvek by foreign travelers. It was considered one of the greatest cities in Cambodia. After Ang Chan I defeated Sdach Korn he moved the capital city from Chaktomuk to Longvek in 1529. This new city was the capital of the Kingdom of Cambodia from 1529 to 1594 until the fall of Longvek.

At its peak, Longvek was known to foreign travelers to Southeast Asia and had a notable community of a dozen or so different nationalities living in foreign communities within the compounds of Longvek, including Muslims, the Chinese, the Dutch, and the Spanish. The Longvek era sparked a second golden age of Khmer culture following the Angkor Empire. In the 1570s, Longvek captured thousands of Siamese slaves in her raids on Siamese cities and incorporated them into Longvek. In 1593, Longvek was sacked and burned by King Naresuan of Siam, bringing an end to the second Cambodian golden age and starting the Cambodian Dark Ages.

The ancient fortress city of Longvek's site

== History ==
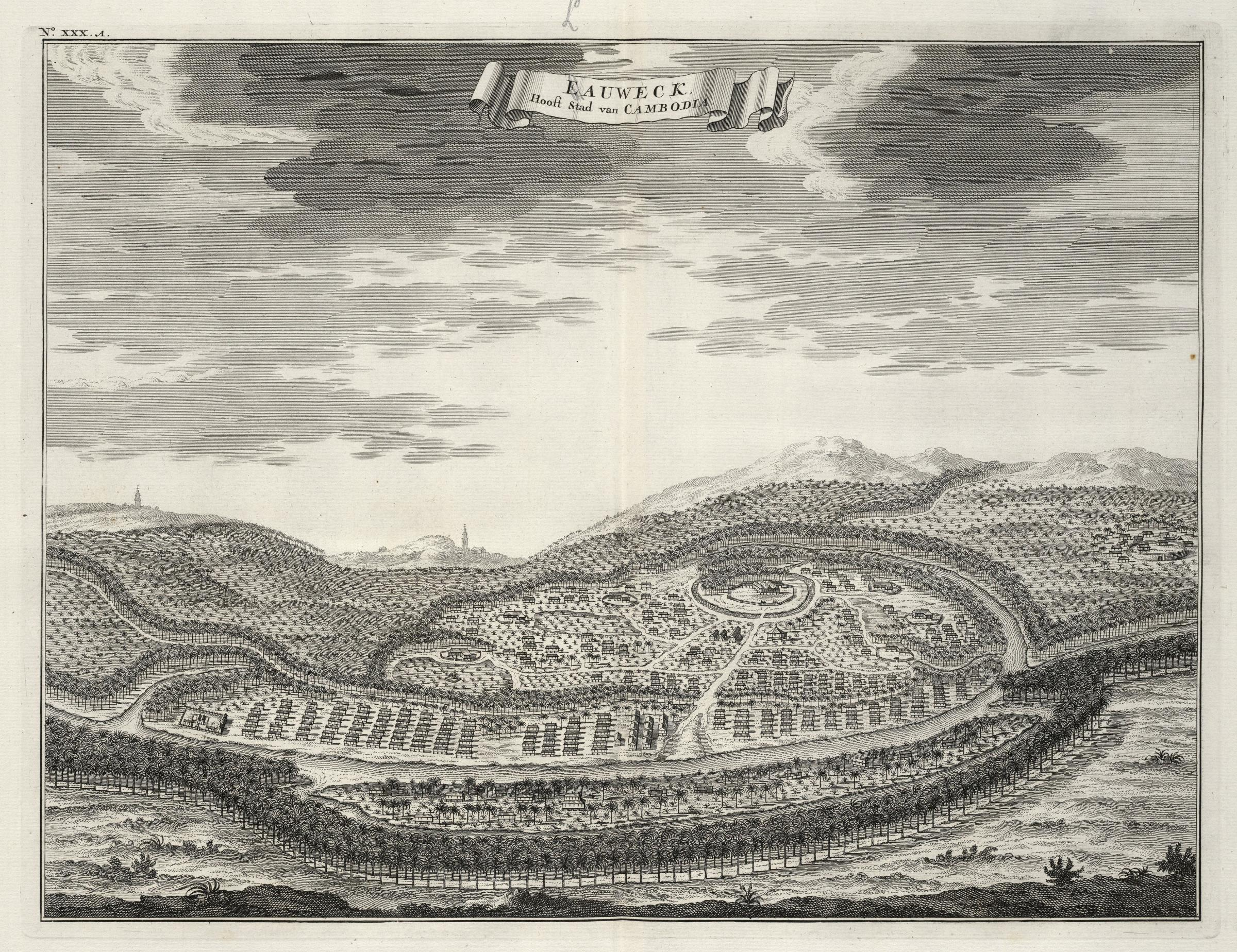
A drawing by Dutch mapmaker Johannes Vingboons, "Eauweck, hooftstadt van Cambodia - Longvek, capital of Cambodia"

During the 14th and 15th centuries, Cambodia was undergoing a major transition from the Angkor Empire. Following Cambodia's conversion to Therevada Buddhism and the rise of international sea trade, the Khmer kings gradually abandoned Angkor to head further south towards the sea. Longvek was located halfway between Phnom Penh and the southern end of the Tonlé Sap and it was chosen by King Outey Reachea III (1516–1566) as his official capital.

Longvek became the nation's capital in the 16th century after the civil war between King Ang Chan I and Sdach Korn. After Ang chan I victory, he became the new king of Cambodia. In the 16th century, Cambodia entered another golden age where Longvek became a major cosmopolitan trading center of Southeast Asia and managed to project its influence in the Gulf of Siam like the old Angkorian days, in particular following the conquest of Ayutthaya by King Bayinnaung of Burma in 1569. The kings of Cambodia at Longvek would make grand visits back to Angkor Wat and build and restore parts of the old temple complex.

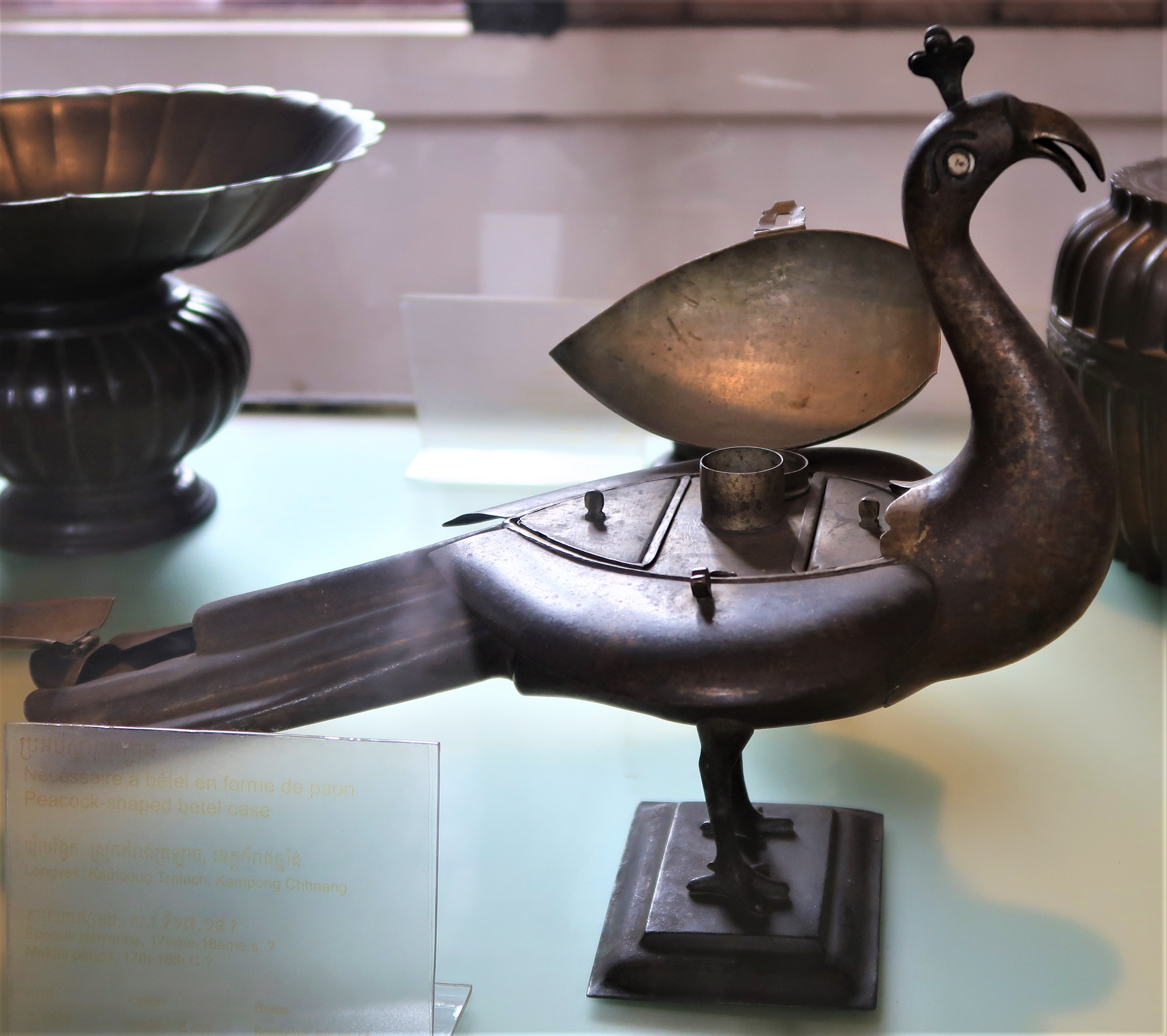
Paan dan (case to store paan) in shape of peacock, originating from Cambodia during the Longvek era (17th or 18th century)

Spanish and Portuguese adventurers and missionaries, like Blas Ruiz de Hernán González from Ciudad Real, first visited the kingdom during this period. Blas became a friend of King Satha of Longvek, who was well-disposed towards foreigners, and while in the kingdom got to know Portuguese adventurer Diogo Beloso from Amarante. The Iberians referred to Chaktomuk as "Churdumuco" and to Srei Santhor as "Sistor". Not long thereafter Longvek was invaded by the Siamese ruler of Ayutthaya.

King Naresuan of Siam conquered Longvek in 1593. Naresuan seized most of Longvek's artisans and looted the gold treasuries of Longvek and brought them back to Siam. The fall of Longvek is well remembered in popular Cambodian history and is seen as a source of extensive historical trauma for Cambodian history. This conquest marked a downturn in the kingdom's fortunes. In the historical period that followed, Cambodia became a pawn in a power struggle between its two increasingly powerful neighbors, Siam and Vietnam.

== In popular culture ==
There are replicas of the royal throne room hall and Vihāra of Wat Tralaeng Kaeng temples of the Longvek Royal Palace for filming movies or TV dramas containing content related to the Longvek era in Prommitr film studio which is located inside Surasi Military Camp, Lat Ya sub districts, Mueang Kanchanaburi district, Kanchanaburi province. The purpose of the building was to be used for filming The Legend of King Naresuan for the first time and is used for filming movies or TV dramas containing scenes related to Cambodia in Thai films and TV series up to the present day.

== Bibliography ==
- Ben Kiernan, Blood and soil ISBN 978-0-300-10098-3 ISBN 0300100981
- Sanjay Subrahmanyam & Marie-José Capelle, L'Empire portugais d'Asie, 1500–1700; Histoire politique et économique. Maisonneuve & Larose (1999) ISBN 2-7068-1252-4 ISBN 978-2706812521
