= Ros Chantrabot =

Khmer historian and member of the Royal Academy of Cambodia

- Born: បណ្ឌិតសភាចារ្យ រស់ ចន្ត្រាបុត្រ; 1 September 1945 (age 80); Phnom Penh, Cambodia
- Education: Royal University of Phnom Penh
- Alma mater: École pratique des hautes études
- Occupations: Writer, journalist, historian, philosopher, politician
- Children: 3
- Writing career
- Language: Khmer; French
- Notable works: Sdach Korn (2006); Histoire du Cambodge : partie légendaire et lapidaire (1996); La Republique khmere : 1970-1975 (1978)
- Notable awards: Royal Academy of Cambodia

Ros Chantrabot is a Khmer novelist, poet, historian and member of the Royal Academy of Cambodia.

== Biography ==
=== Education and early career as a journalist in the turmoil of the Khmer Civil War ===
Ros Chantrabot was born on September 1, 1945, in Phnom Penh, under the French protectorate of Cambodia. Very early, he discovered a passion for writing and he composed poems on a daily basis. Along with other Khmer authors of his period such as Soth Polin, Ros Chantrabot was influenced in his writing style by French writer Jean-Paul Sartre and the philosophy of existentialism. He began his career in journalism as the owner and editor-in-chief of Khmer language newspaper Ponleu Angkor (1967). From 1968 to 1970, he was the editor of the French state-run newspaper Le Courier Phnom-Penhois. In 1970, he received a License es Lettre with an option in French philosophy from the University of Phnom Penh. As a friend of Lon Non whose secret anti-Sihanouk meetings he had joined in 1968, Ros Chantrabot supported the Khmer Republic when it tipped over the monarchy in 1970 as well as its anti-Vietnamese policies. He rejected the claim that this coup was the work of the United States of America, and explained that its main protagonist were Lon Non and Sirik Matak.

In 1971, he was elected as a member of the committee drafting of the Constitution of the Khmer Republic, before moving to France in 1973 to flee from the corruption of the Khmer government officials and to study at the Sorbonne and the Ecole Pratique des Hautes Etudes (EPHE). In 1978, he eventually obtained his Doctorate in Political Science, International Relations - Political Geography on Southeast Asia and Khmer History.

=== Research on Khmer history during his exile in France ===
He worked as an associate researcher at the Center national de Recherche Scientifique in Paris until he could return to Cambodia after the monarchy was restored in 1992.

=== Restoring an intellectual elite in Cambodia ===
From 2001 to 2006, he was President of the Institute of Humanities and Sociology at the Royal University of Phnom Penh.

From 2005 to 2009, he was Vice President of the Royal Academy of Cambodia.

Ros Chantrabot is also a personal Adviser to Hun Sen, Prime Minister of the Kingdom of Cambodia with the rank of Senior Minister.

== Private life ==
Ros Chantrabot is married and has three children.

== Contribution ==
=== Politics: a certain view of Cambodia ===
Ros Chantrabot is a privileged witness of the disrupted history of Cambodia since the 1960s, having been close to King Sihanouk, Lon Non and currently Hun Sen. He wrote a history of the Khmer Republic in which he blamed the failure of republican politics on the petty motivations and rivalries of Cambodian politicians. Obviously traumatized by the sight of his country after the destruction inflicted by four years of Khmer Rouge tyranny and over a decade of Vietnamese occupation, Ros Chantrabot had a very depressed vision of Cambodia in the early 1990s, which was widely shared with other survivors of this violent regimes.

Since the fall of the Angkor kingdom, Cambodians have been caught in a vicious downward spiral of self-destruction and suicide.

— Ros Chantrabot, 1994

As he returned to Cambodia in 1992, he expressed a certain scepticism for the future of democracy in Cambodia.

For centuries, the Khmer people have been blindfolded, with their mouths gagged and their ears plugged.

— Ros Chantrabot, 1993

Ros Chantrabot nevertheless defended a patriotic love for Cambodia, which he defined according to the traditional definition of the Khmer Empire as "any parcel of land on which a palm-tree grows", and contributed to shaping the popular image of the Kingdom of Cambodia promoted by Hun Sen. For that reason, in 2007, he opposed the filming of a Thai movie production in Preah Vihear. He joined the effort to rebuild an intelligentsia in Cambodia joining the Royal Academy of Cambodia as a pro-government historian. He has criticized the proliferations of low-quality institutions and diplomas in what he referred to as the “PhD nation”.

=== Historiography: rediscovering the figure of Sdach Korn ===
Ros Chantrabot has edited and published Cambodian Royal Chronicles helping to renew the study of Khmer historiography by integrating folklore and official narratives with Khmer inscriptions. One such figure is Ta Di, a post-Angkorian military commander, whose legend is close to that of neak ta Khleang Moeung, and who was immortalised in the form of a statue in Preah Vihear province with the assent of Ros Chantrabot. He has also actively promoted the figure of Sdach Korn in Khmer history. Since a visit to Srei Santhor in 2001 with Alain Forest, his research, encouraged by Prime Minister Hun Sen who financed and prefaced his book, has resulted in the publication a new biography of the legendary regicide king of Cambodia.

== Publications ==
=== Publications in Khmer language ===
- ម្ចាស់ប្តីដួងចិត្តអូន ប្រលោមលោក, ភ្នំពេញ, ១៩៦៥
- កម្រងទស្សនវិជ្ជាភាគ ១-១០ បណ្ណាល័យមហាជន, ភ្នំពេញ, ១៩៦៩-១៩៧១
- ប្រវត្តិទស្សវិជ្ជាភាគ ១-៣ បណ្ណាល័យមហាជន, ភ្នំពេញ, ១៩៧០
- អាម៉ុក ឬជនវិកលនៅម៉ាឡេស៊ី (Amok ou le fou de Malaisie), ភ្នំពេញ, ១៩៧១ ចុះផ្សាយប្រចាំថ្ងៃក្នុងសារព័ត៌មាន ‘មហាជន’
- សូក្រាត (Socrate) បណ្ណាល័យមហាជន, ភ្នំពេញ, ១៩៧១
- អំពីសេ្នហា (De I’Amour) ការសាកល្បង ផ្នែកសង្គមសាស្ត្រ បណ្ណាល័យ មហាជន, ភ្នំពេញ, ១៩៧១
- វិបត្តិអំណាច (La crise du pouvoir) ផ្នែកនយោបាយ បណ្ណាល័យមហាជន, ភ្នំពេញ, ១៩៧២
- ប្រវត្តិសាស្ត្រខ្មែរ ភាគទី១ តាមរឿងព្រេងនិទាន និងសិលាចារិក (Histoire du Cambodge), Paris, ១៩៩៨
- ប្រាសាទព្រះខ័នកំពង់ស្វាយ, ការសិក្សាស្រាវជ្រាវប្រវត្តិសាស្ត្រ, ភ្នំពេញ, ២០០៦
- ព្រះស្តេចកន ការផ្សាយរបស់អ្នកនិពន្ធ, ភ្នំពេញ, ២០០៦
- ប្រាសាទព្រះវិហារ អតីតកាលរុងរឿង មោទនភាពជាតិខ្មែរ ការផ្សាយរបស់អ្នកនិពន្ធ, ភ្នំពេញ, ២០០៨
- ដំណើរស្វែងរកសន្តិភាពនៅកម្ពុជា ការផ្សាយរបស់អ្នកនិពន្ធ, ភ្នំពេញ, ២០១៣
- ដំណើរស្វែងរកសន្តិភាពនៅកម្ពុជា, ភ្នំពេញ, ២០១៦
- សាធារណរដ្ឋខ្មែរ, CamEd Business School, ភ្នំពេញ, ២០១៧
- លេខ៥ក្នុងមនោគមន៍វិជ្ជាខ្មែរ, ភ្នំពេញ, ២០១៧

=== Publications in English and French language ===
- Les Forces Armées Nationales Khmères (FANK), mémoire de L’EPHE-Sorbonne VIe section, inédit, Paris, 1973.
- La République Khmère et l’Asie du Sud-Est (après son écroulement), Thèse de Doctorat de I’EHESS, inédit, Paris, 1978.
- Chantrabot, Ros (1993). La Republique khmere : 1970-1975. L'Harmattan. OCLC 878986608.
- Chantrabot, Ros (1998). Pravattisāstr Khmaer = Histroire du Cambodge : partie légendaire et lapidaire (in French). Paris: L'Harmattan. ISBN 2-7384-7131-5. OCLC 42376884.
- Cambodge, la répétition de l’Histoire (de 1991 aux élections de juillet 1998), You Féng, Paris, 2000.
- The Khmer Republic, CamEd Business School, Phnom Penh, 2017
