= Khleang Moeung =

Mythological character in Cambodia

Ta Pech, Khleang Moeung or Sena Moeung (Khmer: ឃ្លាំង មឿង; UNGEGN: Khlĕəng Mœăng, ALA-LC: Ghlāṃṅ Mīoeṅ, [kʰlĕəŋ mɨəŋ]) is a mythical-historical sixteenth century military leader in, and a guardian spirit neak ta whose field of action extends to the entire west of Tonle Sap Lake.

== Etymology: treasure, strength or center ==
Khleang Moeung has a mixed Khmer and Thai etymology. Ghlāṃṅ is Khmer for "treasure, keeper for the treasury, storehouse" while Mīoeṅ is Thai for "municipality, region or country”. Thus, keeper of the local treasury. A similar interpretation is made for the name of Thai national hero Pha Mueang who played a significant role in the founding of the Sukhothai Kingdom, freeing Siam from Khmer rule after the reign of Jayavarman VII in the 13th century.

According to another interpretation, khlāṃṅ is also a Siamese word loaned from the Khmer and can take the acception of “magically strong, having a sacred power” which is in tune with qualities attributed to Ghlāṃṅ Mīoeṅ in some legends.

Finally, klāṅ can also mean “the middle” in Thai language. The notion of a “centre” of the territory fits the idea of a “navel of the village” present in old circular villages in the province of Siem Reap as well as in many Thai societies. It designates the central post, phallic in shape, symbolizing the village as a whole in fertility and protection rites.

== Sources: conflicting versions of the legend in oral and written traditions ==
Cambodian Royal Chronicles of 1904 and 1906, which were written three centuries after the fact, are the main source for events concerning the life of Khleang Moeung. The story of Khleang Moeung is not recorded in any earlier Chronicles, nor in any other known written document.

The version given in the Cambodian Royal Chronicles “strongly differ” from those kept through oral traditions, especially those of Pursat, as documented first by French ethologist Adhémard Leclère in 1914 and later in more detail by Khmer scholar Khing Hoc Dy and analyzed by French ethnologist Alain Forest.

The Cambodian Royal Chronicles were inspired from oral traditions of Pursat, which in turn the oral traditions were influenced by the Royal Chronicles resulting in a blurred boundary between the Cambodian Royal Chronicles and oral traditions.

While the Cambodian Royal Chronicles closely associates the ritual to commemorate Khleang Moeung's death with Sdach Korn, the story in Pursat links it with the Siamese troops’ attack without showing any connection to Korn's anti-monarchy figure. In fact, the Cambodian Royal Chronicles go as far as to change the Thai-influenced name of Khleang Moeung into the more Khmer Ta Pech, or Diamond General.

=== Khmer Oral traditions ===
Various legends concerning Khleang Moeung, each with a specific geographical focus, circulate in Cambodia.

==== Pursat oral tradition ====
According to the oral tradition in Pursat, from the year 1504 a king named Srey Sukonthor ruled the relatively new Kingdom of Cambodia. 1512 saw the end of his rule, when an enthusiastic rebellion successfully overthrew the crown and saw its leader, Sdach Korn, take the throne. The displaced King Sukonthor was killed and his younger brother Chan Reachea – rightful heir to the throne – fled to Siam. In 1516, Chan Reachea managed to convince the King of Siam Ramathibodi II that he had found a white elephant living in the eastern forests. The king excitedly gave Reachea regiments of his own elephant-mounted armies, food, and swords to capture the legendary animal. Once in Cambodia, Chan Reachea used this army to turn against Sdach Korn and face his army in Pursat. As the issue of the battle between the two camps became more and more uncertain, one of his generals, Ta Moeun, dug a pit, filled with poisonous swords and threw himself to a certain death promising to come back. Days later, his spirit returned commanding an army of ghosts which plagued King Korn's forces with diseases such as cholera, eventually helping to win back the throne for Chan Reachea in 1525 who became king as Ang Chan I.

==== Kampot oral tradition ====
After ethnographic research in the province of Kampot in 1950, French ethnologist André Souyris-Rolland published a research paper recounting an inverted version of the myth of neak ta Khleang Moeung, associated with a king Chey Chettha I.

==== Cardamom oral tradition ====
According to an oral tradition in the Cardamom Mountains, Khleang Moeung was actually a Pear tribal named Nup who managed to raise the phantom army through the intervention of the tribe's guardian spirit.

This identity is backed by other local stories saying that Khleang Moeung was born in the Cardamom Mountains. The “dance of the wild oxen” and the “dance of the peacocks” performed during the annual homage ceremony are presented in Pursat as a specificity of the ritual recalling the Pear of the Cardamoms.

=== Written source: Royal Chronicles of Cambodia ===
The first written source on Khleang Moeung is found in the Royal Chronicles of 1906 which recall an early veneration of neak ta Khleang Muong in the 16th century. Facing defeat against the Thai, Khmer general Khleang Moeung threw himself into a ditch of stakes with his wife and three sons at Bakan in Pursat Province. Transformed into an army of ghosts, they sowed the seeds of cholera in the enemy, who were subsequently defeated. His death by unnatural means transformed him into a powerful protective spirit (neak ta). During the reign of Satha I (1576–1594), Longvek itself came under Thai attack. The king protected his capital by venerating the potent Buddha Kaya Siddhi image at Wat Brah Inda Deba and worshipping at the shrine of Khleang Moeung. To counter these supernatural defenses, two wizards disguised as Buddhist monks were sent to Cambodia by the Thai king, probably Naresuan (r. 1590–1605). Gaining the king's confidence, they drove Satha insane, convincing him that his problems emanated from the malign influences of the Buddha Kaya Siddhi and the previously mentioned Buddha of Wat Tralaeng Kaeng. Satha ordered both images to be broken and thrown into the river. The chronicles tell us that this caused the sacred sword of Khmer kingship, preah khan reach, to rust; the waters of a sacred spring at Banon, Battambang Province, dried up; a Buddha image at Wat Vihear Suor, in Srei Santhor, cracked and bled; and the leaves of a bodhi tree at Longvek fell out of season. Cholera spread across the land, and the Thai gained control. Only when the pieces of the sacred images were recovered, reassembled, and restored to their rightful place was the enemy repulsed.

== History ==
The legend of Khleang Moeung has inspired Cambodian patriotism and royalism since its inception.

=== Oral legend attested in Pursat during the 17th century ===
Mikaelian's studies on the power legitimisation of Khmer rulers during the seventeenth century show that the Khleang Moeung story in Pursat also has a connection with ethnic Pear who were in charge of Khmer people royal elephants during those years because it depicts Khleang Moeung as a Pear.

=== Rewriting the oral legend in the Khmer Royal Chronicles at the beginning of the 20th century ===
At the beginning of the 20th century, a certain rewriting of national Khmer history was needed to reinforce the moral and political power of the Cambodian Royal Palace, which had been shaken by revolts and protests, as well as by the tightening of French colonial rule over the kingdom. More specifically, the reworked narrative contained within the text reflects Sisowath's thinking: his own succession to the throne following his elder brother King Norodom had only come about because the French put him there when Norodom's eldest son Prince Norodom Yukanthor had fallen into disfavour. Sisowath thus instructed the narrative to be rewritten to make Sdach Korn into an unmistakable usurper in order to underline that Srı̄ Sugandhapad's younger brother Ang Chan, like himself, was the legitimate ruler. This formulation helped to justify the legitimacy of Sisowath succeeding his brother in 1904.

=== A Khmer Joan of Arc in the Crusade for Independence ===
In the twentieth century the legend of Khleang Moeung was utilized by the French protectorate due to the Vichy regime's emphasis on the construction of a Cambodian national identity linked to an idealization of the Angkorean era and the promotion of wartime heroes like Khleang Moeung. A 1943 article in the newspaper Kampuchea likened the spirit of self-sacrifice demonstrated by Khleang Moeung and his wife to Joan of Arc's "valiant conduct and patriotic fervor".

In 1953, after Cambodia gained independence from France, King Norodom Sihanouk built a hall to shelter the grave of Khleang Moeung in Pursat through which the latter acquired a country-wide reputation. When Lon Nol staged a coup to overthrow Sihanouk, the villagers say people saw ominous scars appear on the hill, and blood running out of them.

=== Civil War: from praise to plunder ===
In 1967, Khmer author Kouy Laut published a novel titled Khleang Moeung with a strong anti-Siamese bend, which would be brought on the stage of the National Theater of Cambodia.

In the early 1970s, as civil war raged in Cambodia, Sos Math — one of the country's most popular singers—had a song entitled “Khleang Moeung's Advice” in which a husband says goodbye to his beloved wife and children as he is about to go to war. “You may perish but your nation survives: Your name will be known everywhere,” the song goes.

However, in Tren Ngea's two-volume classical history book on Cambodia's national past, published between in the 1970s, when telling the story of Sdach Korn's success in claiming the throne as well as his defeat of Ang Chan, the author does not refer explicitly to Khleang Moeung. Instead Tren used the figure ‘Pich’ whom he selectively invested with the various characteristics associated with Khleang Moeung in Cambodian Royal Chronicles.

A rumor starting spreading that one of the great heroes of the past, such as Po Kambo or neak ta Khleang Moeung, would soon be returning to take part in the war in the context of the millennial tinge created by the Civil War.

The Khmers Rouges communists desecrated the sanctuary of the neak ta Khleang Moeung. The Khmer Rouge iconoclasts cut off the statue's head and arms and dumped the pieces into a nearby pond. A year later, the Khmer Rouge ordered a canal be dug across the area. The centuries-old Samrong tree, under which Moeung is said to have sheltered when he trained his troops, was to be removed, which was done not without difficulty.

During the terror perpetrated by the Angkar of the Khmers Rouges, Khmer musician Daran Kravanh details how as a medium of Khleang Moeung he chanted petitions to the neak ta for protection from a certain death.

=== Resurrecting a national emblem of patriotic royalism ===
In the 1980s and 1990s, following various efforts to reconstruct knowledge of Cambodia's collective past after the Khmer Rouge era, both Sdach Korn and Khleang Moeung both became an integral part of this historical reconstruction.

After the Khmer Rouge were overthrown, the broken pieces of the statue were collected from the pond and put back together in the sanctuary of Pursat that had been completely destroyed. A provincial judge built a wooden shelter to thank neak ta Khleang Moeung after the spirit helped to release Samnang's wife from Khmer Rouge custody.

Khleang Moeung was chosen as the name of one of the best and more successful anti-communist resistance groups that pledged loyalty to the king after the formation of FUNCINPEC in February 1981 and was formally incorporated into the ranks of A.N.S. (Armée nationale sihanoukiste) on 5 March 1979.

=== National and partisan symbol since 1990 ===
Before 1975, Khleang Moeung was mainly a neak ta for people of the region of Pursat. Since 1990, his legend has become part of the official patriotic discourse as school students in Cambodia learn that he was a military commander who fought and defeated the Siamese army toward the 16th century. Cambodian soldiers have long viewed him as a hero who sacrificed his life to save the country and continues to offer protection in the afterlife.

In 1993, Prince Ranariddh built a concrete hall to replace the wooden shelter, in commemoration of the spirit of neak ta Khleang Moeung for bringing him electoral success as his father Sihanouk had done forty years earlier.

In 1996, Ranariddh returned as First premier to Pursat and made a speech in front of the statue of Khleang Moeung on the true meaning of Khmer patriotism.

During the factional fighting between the Cambodian People's Party and Funcinpec in the streets of Phnom Penh in July 1997, Funcinpec military commander Nhiek Bun Chhay stopped at Khleang Moeung's shrine as he was fleeing the country to avoid being arrested by the Cambodian People's Party.

In December 2015, opposition leader Sam Rainsy brought up the tale of Khleang Moeung, using the version of the story reported by French researcher Adhémard Leclère in 1914. Rainsy wrote of a military leader who “sacrificed his life to help eliminate a usurper, thus allowing the legitimate heir to accede to the throne under the name of Ang Chan Reachea.” The usurper he was referring to was King Kan, whom Prime Minister Hun Sen is known to admire and who, according to some versions of history, was not of royal blood. As a matter of fact, His Excellency Prime Minister Hun Sen has never been to the shrine in Pursat, as he has fostered since the early 2000s the idea that he is the reincarnation of Sdach Korn, King Ang Chan's enemy, and thus also Khleang Moeung's.

== Ethics: the most powerful neak ta of Cambodia ==
As a living man who joined the dead in order to summon them in support of the living, Khleang Moeung is the paradigm of the medium and is a common object or subject of possession across Cambodia today.

=== Tutelary spirit of Pursat ===
==== Site: a potent place ====
Khleang Moeung is the neak ta land guardian spirit of the sanctuary erected in his name in Pursat province where Buddhism and land guardian spirit cults are entangled in a single still hierarchical religious system.

The neak ta Khleang Moeung of Pursat is deemed to be the most famous neak ta in the country. The mytheme of Khleang Moeung is locally materialized in Pursat through a sacred geography structured in a coherent network centered on the place of worship of Khleang Moeung.

His shrine is five kilometers northwest of Pursat town, and the annual ceremonies of homage can be particularly impressive. Neak ta Khleang Moeung's exploits once formed part of the repertoire of the National Theater and were often performed during times of tension with Thailand. In this sense, he may be regarded as the protector of the realm. Indeed, when Cambodia gained independence, Sihanouk had an enclosure built around Khleang Moeung's statue. It was broken up and thrown into a nearby pond during the Pol Pot era but has now been recovered and reconstituted.

Ruins of a post-Angkorean laterite tower stand in the middle of the monastery suggesting an ancestral royal presence on site. A monumental statue of Buddha has been built on it since the end of the Khmer Rouge regime.

==== Rite: an annual rite with a specific ritual servant ====
The ceremony to honor Khleang Moeung and all others who have sacrificed their lives for Cambodia since 1516 takes place once a year on a Saturday during the sixth month of the lunar year, or bisakh (April–May), at Khleang Moeung's ashram sacred compound in the Bakan District of Pursat.

The practical ritual rules to be respected in the organization of Khleang Moeun's annual homage gives the first role to a ritual servant, called the me smịṅ and not to a medium. He is specifically male. His has a place in a line of succession, which presumes that he is a distant heir of the Angkorian servants of divinities appointed by the king. The ritual servant has an official form of legitimation, as he was even paid by the local governor of Pursat until the Khmers Rouges. However, the ritual servant does not experience trembling and possession as other mediums in Cambodia.

==== Comparative mythology: the spiritual value of human sacrifice ====
According to tradition, the propitiation of neak ta Khleang Moeung once involved the sacrifice of a male buffalo in each province of the kingdom. Even today, in Pursat, the sacrifice of buffalo during the annual homage ceremony is symbolised by a pair of horns presented among the offerings. Khleang Moeung's voluntary death may therefore also symbolise such a human sacrifice.

The Royal chronicles of Ayutthaya mention human sacrifices taking place at the feet of pillars of cities such as Bangkok, Vientiane and Luang Prabang in order to produce a land guardian spirit (phi muang).

The modes of sacrifice by burying alive and impalement are found in the literature on Thai ritual practices.

The mytheme is also similar to the story of the land guardian spirit Cao Com, “Lord of the Summit”, who died voluntarily by impalement — on the tusks of an elephant rather than on spears as in most Khleang Moeung legends.

The ritual institution of Khleang Moeung, as center and protector of the village, developed as a practice aimed at protecting the Khmer territory in the aftermath of the destruction of Angkor, especially in places where such borders were threatened.

=== Propagation of the neak ta Khleang Moeung in Cambodia ===
The neak ta Khleang Moeung is also seen as powerful as to have authority over other neak ta of other areas, such as in Phnom Choeung Prey in Cheung Prey District.

Contrary to other neak ta, Khleang Moeung's audience is far larger and reaches all the provinces of Cambodia. Since 1990, the neak ta Khleang Moeung has been invoked across Cambodia, as in Oudong, and even abroad in the Khmer diaspora, as in California.

In Wat Ounalom in Phnom Penh, now the headquarters of the Maha Nikaya sect, a statue was dedicated to neak ta Khleang Moeung fairly early on.

==== The duplicate neak ta of Peah Vihear ====
A suspiciously similar story is told of neak ta Ta Dey of Preah Vihear Province, who supposedly threw himself off the Preah Vihear escarpment in battle, then also returned to lead a victorious ghost army against the living Siamese.

==== Neak ta Khleang Moeun in Kampot province ====
Khleang Moeung was widely regarded as a spiritual protector in the area of Phnom Dvear, Kampot province, some 150 kilometres to the south of Phnom Penh, who helped Khmer royal armies defeat both rebellions and the Vietnamese.

==== The sacrifice of a clay buffalo in Kampong Chhnang ====
In Kampong Chhnang Province until the 1950s, a sacrifice was made yearly in honor of neak ta Khleang Moeung during which a clay statue of a water buffalo was decapitated in substitution for the sacrifice of the living animal.

=== Proliferation in the Khmer diaspora of America ===
Following a ceremony in 1994 sponsored by a Khmer-American family to summon his spirit in Oudong, a new ritual flag raising ceremony for community healing was created in honour of Khleang Moeung in California on 3 March 1996, with the integration of authentic traditional elements, monks, mediums and music. Since this event on March 3, 1996 there has been a proliferation of Khleang Moeung spirit medium groups in the United States of America. In 1997, a request to have a yearly ceremony held at the Willow Street Temple was refused by the abbot Venerable Kong Chean on the basis that such a ritual was too brahmanical.

Thus, an expression of Khmer national identity can be found in the religious rituals of the spirit cult of Khleang Moeung.

== Representation ==
In Pursat, the neak ta Khleang Moeung has evolved from an amorphous form, i.e. a termite mound and a usual sign of the presence of a chthonian spirit, to an anthropomorphic one with statues becoming more and more realistic. In the 2000s, his statue was that of a man of an earlier era with square shoulders and a bushy moustache — his representation maybe denoting a trace of Siamese influence, similar to Chao Anou, the last king of Vientiane, whose statue faces the Mekong in this city. In 2010 the Culture department of Pursat province had a new statue made, projecting a very different message about Khleang Moeung's identity: seated, in a noble but very human pose, on a throne, under a chatra parasol denoting his rank as a modern-looking Khmer man.

== Culture ==
=== Music ===
Sos Math—one of the country's most popular singers in the 1970s—had a song entitled “Khleang Moeung's Advice”.

=== Literature ===
In the 1967, an anti-Siamese novel called Khleang Moeung was published in Phnom Penh and it became a popular play performed by the National Theater in honour of Khleang Moeung, in order to praise the resolute courage of the Khmer soldiers in fighting the Siamese.

=== Cinema ===
The 1967 novel was brought to the screen and released in the cinemas in Phnom Penh and Siem Reap in February 1969.

=== Topography ===
Khleang Moeung has many streets named in honour of him including one in Phnom Penh where he is titled as Okhna: Oknha Khleang Moeung (Street 70), Tuol Sangke Sangkat, Russey Keo Khan, Phnom Penh Capital, Cambodia.

== Bibliography ==
- Yamada, Teri (2004) ‘The Spirit Cult of Khleang Moeung in Long Beach, California.’ In John Marston and Elizabeth Guthrie eds History, Buddhism, and New Religious Movements in Cambodia. Honolulu: University of Hawai‘i Press, pp. 213–225.
- Guillou, Anne Yvonne (2017-10-20). "Khmer Potent Places: Pāramī and the Localisation of Buddhism and Monarchy in Cambodia". The Asia Pacific Journal of Anthropology. 18 (5): 421–443. doi:10.1080/14442213.2017.1375553. ISSN 1444-2213. S2CID 148979217.
- Guillou, Anne Yvonne (2020). The present life of post-angkorian royal land tutelary spirits. Péninsule/Association des Amis de Yosothor. ISBN 978-2-35321-409-9.
