= Sdach Korn =

King of Cambodia from 1512 to 1525

Srei Chettha II
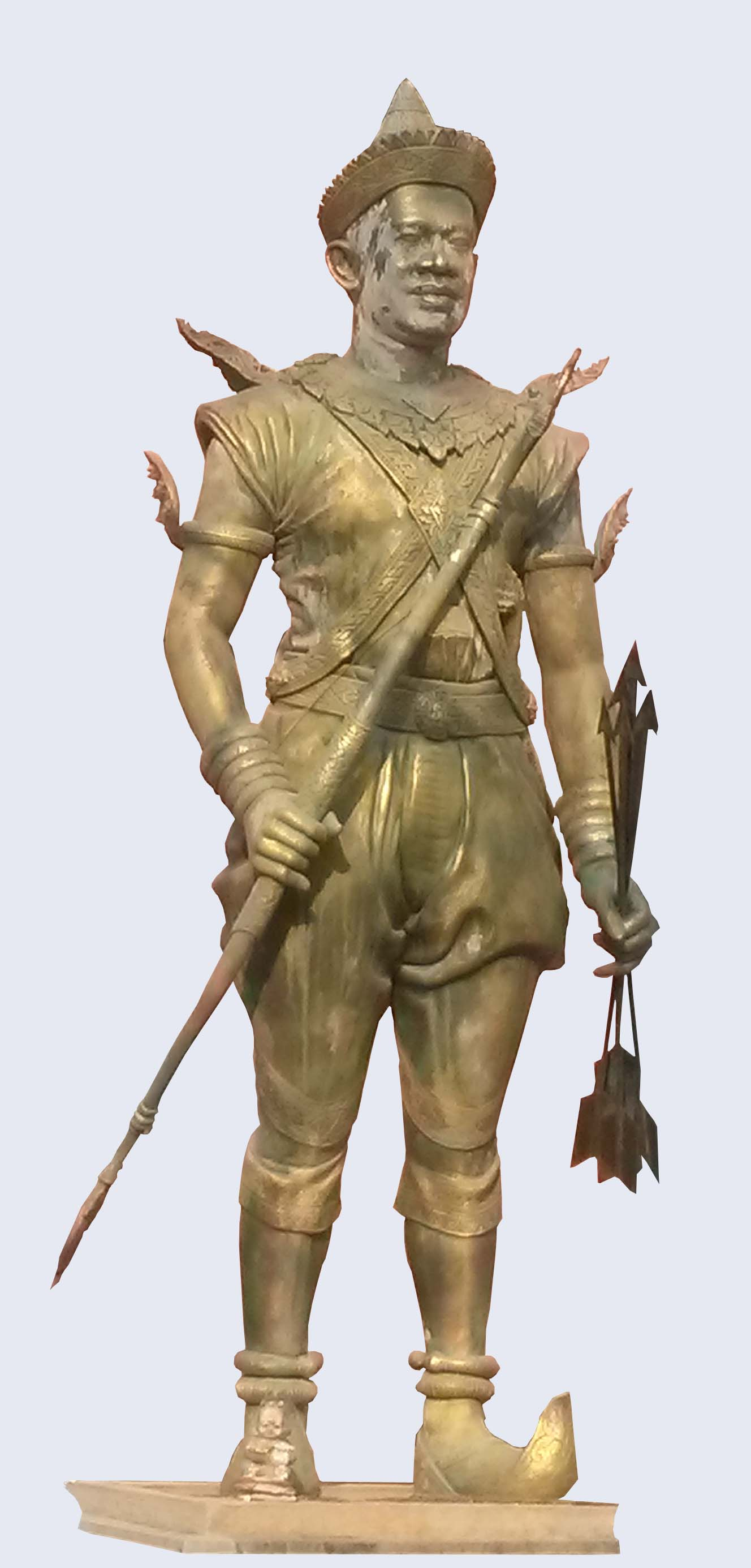
- Statue of Sdach Korn

King of Cambodia
- Reign: 1512 – 1525
- Predecessor: Srey Sokunbat
- Successor: Ang Chan I
- Born: c. 1483; Srey Sorchhor, Cambodia
- Died: 1529 (aged 45–46); Jerngkor Forest, Tboung Khmum, Cambodia
- Burial: Srey Santhor district
- Consort: Chea Leng
Names
- Srey Chetha
- House: Sdach Korn
- Father: Pichey Nekem
- Mother: Ban
- Religion: Theravada Buddhism prev. Hinduism

Sdach Korn (Khmer: ស្ដេចកន), also known as Srei Chettha II (ព្រះស្រីជេដ្ឋាទី២, Srījeṭṭhādī), or Srei Chetha Thireach Reameathiptei (ស្រីជេដ្ឋាធិរាជរាមាធិបតី, Srījeṭṭhādhirājarāmādhipatī), was the King of Cambodia from 1512 to 1525. Korn dethroned the king and attempted to establish a new dynasty. Though little is known about his life as evidence from the 15th and 16th centuries in Cambodia is sparse, Sdach Korn remains a controversial figure in Cambodian history. While he can be considered as a brave soldier who overthrew a cruel king, he can also be seen merely as one of the three usurpers of the throne of Cambodia.

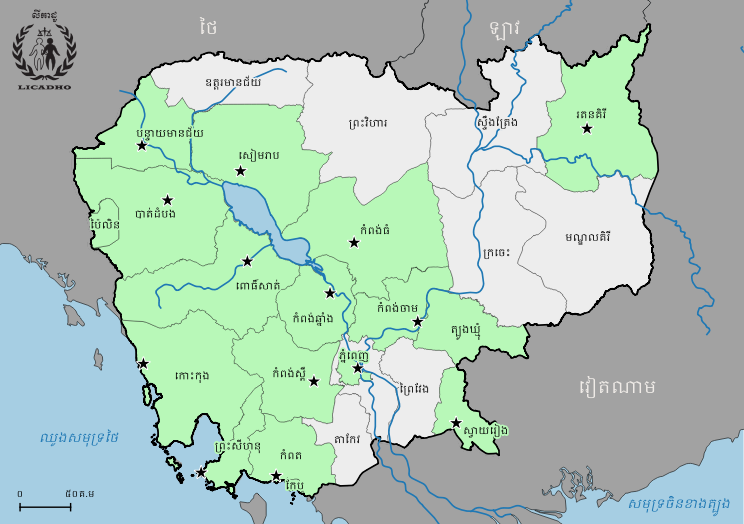

== History ==
The life of Sdach Korn as recorded in the Cambodian Royal Chronicles was first described at the beginning of the twentieth century by ethnologist Adhémard Leclère in French, while the collection of volumes of Documents on the Life of the Khmer Heroes compiled in 1959 by Ang Seng gives more details, especially of the important dreams that determined his life. The latter is the reference for the high school textbook on Khmer History printed by the Royal Ministry for Education and Youth in Cambodia.

=== Early life (1483–1508) ===
Born as a commoner in 1483, Neay Korn was the son of a man named Bra Bijai Naga (Vijayanaka) and his wife Mé-Ban. Korn followed his sister Nang Pean to the Royal Palace when she became a concubine of Srey Sokonthor. Become a favourite of Srey Sokonthor, Korn irritated the king's younger half-brother Chan Reachea who was hoping to climb on the throne after Srey Sokunboth but was forced to flee westwards the Ayutthaya Kingdom with the help of a general known as Ta Mueng. In 1508, Srey Sokunboth had an ominous dream of a powerful dragon chasing him out of his Kingdom, and fleeing eastwards with the royal regalia, while another account of this dream as Srey Sokunboth seeing Korn with two dragons flying around his head. Consulting his oracles or houra achar, Srey Sokunboth learned that he would be overthrown by the young Sdach Korn. To prevent this from happening, Srey Sokunboth planned to order Sdach Korn to go fix a fishing net, then throw another fishing net to drown him in the river; having overheard Srey Skounboth's plan, Neang Pean rushed to tell Sdach Korn beforehand. Therefore, Sdach Korn was able to swim far away and escape eastwards while Srey Sokunboth thought Korn had drowned in the river.

=== Rise to power (1508–1513) ===
In 1508, Korn proclaimed himself as king under the reign name of Srei Chetha Thireach Reameathiptei without ever being in possession of the necessary royal regalia or palladium of the kingdom, the Preah Khan Reach Royal sword. He set his capital city in Srolop Pichey Bateay Prey Nokor, later known as Banteay Prey Nokor, the fortress of Prey Nokor, nowadays located in Nokor Knong Village, Doung Tey Commune, Ponhea Kraek District, Tboung Khmum Province. In 1512, Sdach Korn led a rebellion against Srey Sokunboth from his new capital in Toul Basan taking control over the South and Eastern provinces of Cambodia. Srey Sokunboth had no choice but to flee to Kompong Svay. Sdach Korn set his camp at Phnom Santuk while Srey Sokunboth attempted to escape to Pursat province. One of Korn's generals, Meun Sorintkeo, caught him on the way and killed Srey Sokunboth. Victorious, Sdach Korn imposed an oath of loyalty to him from all the royal army under the command of general Kaw.

=== Fall of a usurper (1514–1525) ===
==== Expansion of Sdach Korn ====
In 1514, Sdach Korn, ruling as Srei Chetha Thireach Reameathiptei expanded his territory to the North to Champasak Province, the east-side to the Champa kingdom, to the South all the way to the sea and West to confront the Reach Seima kingdom. His benevolence saw peace and prosperity come back to the kingdom, as he lowered taxes and tariffs to please the population.

==== Dream and the Battle of Khleang Moeung ====
One night, Sdach Korn dreamed of the moon rising from the West would pierce through his heart, which was interpreted by the houra achar as an ominous sign: Chan Reachea, whose name "Chan" means 'moon' in Khmer as he was born during a lunar eclipse, would return from Ayatthaya and take revenge from him. In fact, after spending eight years at the Royal Court of Ayatthaya and hearing the news about Srey SokunBoth's death, Chan Reachea and Ponhea Oung resolved to return to Cambodia and overthrow the usurper. Chan Reachea fooled the Siamese king into believing that he would catch a white elephant in Cambodia in order to obtain a Thai garnison to support his expedition with 5,000 soldiers, 100 elephant soldiers, food, weapons including the Preah Khan Reach Royal Sword. When the Siamese King realized the true intent of the expedition, he first doubted of its success until he realized Chan Reachea was in possession of the Preah Khan Reach. In 1516, the expedition was launched. Chan Reachea gathered 3,000 more soldiers in Battambang province, 8,000 soldiers in Siem Reap province, and 3,000 more soldiers in Pursat province under the leadership of General Ta Mueng.

On Korn's side, General Kaw led the battle against Chan Reachea. On the other side, Chan Reachea promoted Ta Moeung also known as Khleang as the governor of Pursat province and asked him to lead his army. Sdach Korn's army walked from Longvek to the fortress of Pursat where Chan Reachea had. The siege lasted for 12 months. According to the legend, General Ta Moeung sacrificed himself in other to gather demon soldiers from hell to help Chan Reachea in battle against the Siamese army that had come to support the Khmer usurper Korn. From that point on, Chan Reachea always had an advantage over Sdach Korn. Chan Reachea easily took back the Eastern part of Cambodia including Krokor, Khlong Krang, Boribo River, Kompong Siem, Cheungoprei, Stung Treng.

==== Final surrender and death ====
Sdach Korn's soldiers surrendered to Chan Reachea. In 1516, Chan Reachea climbed on the throned and reestablished the royal Khmer dynasty with full royal regal and legitimacy. Chan Reachea set his city in Banteay Meanchey and Pursat. In 1517, Sdach Korn failed in an attempt to assassinate Chan Reachea. In 1525, after acquiring cannons, Chan Reachea to totally eradicate Korn and his supporters. Chan Reachea separated into three groups, formed a triangle surrounding Srey Sarchhor fortress. Though the usurper and his general Kaw escaped to a nearby city, Chan Reachea surrounded them and after three months of siege, Chan Reachea killed General Kaw and beheaded the usurper. From the moment of his death, Srei Chetha became known as Sdach Korn.

== Policies ==
On top of his fiscal reforms in favour of low taxation, Sdack Korn introduced the first national currency in the kingdom of Cambodia, the sleung, with the image of a dragon imprinted on it, or rather of the mythological hamsa, the vahana (or 'vehicle') of Brahma.

== Legacy ==
=== Literature ===
Khmer historian Tauch Chhuong wrote a play entitled Sdach Korn the Usurper in 1995 and published by the Association of Khmer authors living abroad led by Khing Hoc Dy.

=== Politics ===
Sdach Korn is considered as "being of merit" in Khmer culture and hailed as a charismatic political leader. Sdach Korn has won new popularity since ruling Prime Minister Hun Sen came to power. Many similarities exist between the two, from the peasant origin, to their birth in the year of the naga dragon to their ascension to power. Some have seen this as a political stunt:

The Sdech Kân (sic) narrative is primarily understood to justify the July 1997 events and Ranariddh's political downfall. More broadly, it undermines the legitimacy of a national leadership role for royal family members, and particularly the idea of Sihanouk as the father of national reconciliation."

— Astrid Noren-Nilsson, Cambodia's Second Kingdom: Nation, Imagination, and Democracy

Hun Sen has ordered the creation of the new province of Tbong Khmum where Sdach Korn started his rebellion and prefaced a biography of Sdach Korn, which criticized the bias of the Cambodian Royal Chronicles against the peasant king. In his preface to the official biography by Ros Chantrabot, Hun Sun claims that "[Sdach Korn] should be regarded as a great world hero who promoted and implemented, for the first time, the concepts of freedom right and class struggle among the public in the 16th century".

== Bibliography ==
- Leclère, Adhémard (1910). "Le Sdech Kan". Bulletin de la Société des Études Indochinoises. 59: 15–55.
- Chantrabot, Ros (2007). ព្រះស្តេចកន Preah Sdach Kân. Angkor Bookstore Press.
- Thun, Theara (2020-12-03). "Treason and Loyalty to the Royal Court: The Kan Narrative in Nineteenth- and Early-Twentieth-Century Khmer Chronicle Manuscripts". Journal of the Royal Asiatic Society. 31 (2): 343–362. doi:10.1017/s1356186320000632. ISSN 1356-1863. S2CID 229424362.
