= Santuk District =

Santuk ស្រុកសន្ទុក
- District (srok)
- Location in Cambodia
- Coordinates: 12°40′N 105°30′E
- Country: Cambodia
- Province: Kampong Thom
- Time zone: +7
- Geocode: 0607

Santuk is a district within Kampong Thom Province, in central Cambodia. According to the 1998 census of Cambodia, it had a population of 58,434. Santuk Silk Farm and Phnom Santuk lie in the district.

== Administration ==
The following table shows the villages of Stueng Saen Municipality by commune.

Khum (Communes)	Phum (Villages)
Boeng Lvea	Boeng Lvea, Kaoh Bangkov, Tbaeng, Sangkruoh, Trapeang Tuem, Trapeang Prei, Ou Ampil, Ou Angkonh, Ou Thom, Romdul Thmey, Ou KroNhoung, Ou Korki, Trapeang Korkos
Chroab	Tuol Vihear, Chey Mongkol, Sdok Sdam, Ou Kaoh Kokir
Kampong Thma	Prey Phlu, Thon Moung, Tuol Sangkae, Kampong Thma, Kang Sau, Chheu Teal, Khley, Snao, Khvaek, L'ak, S'ang
Kakaoh	Chey Chumneah, Kiri Von, Tboung Krapeu, Cheay Sbai, Svay Kal, Santuk Knong, Santuk Krau, Chi Meakh, Sala Santuk, Samnak
Kraya	Kraya, Tok, Trapeang Pring, Dang Kdar, Ta Menh, Sopheak Mongkol, Thma Samlieng, Chheu Teal Chrum, Trapeang Ruessei, Ou Tuek Thla, Saen Serei Mongkul
Pnov	Traeuy Ou, Pnov, Kang Meas
Prasat	Sampong, Sivottha, Chambak Chrum, Prasat, Ta Nhaok, Srae Ta Kao, Traeuy Myab, Leav, Banteay Yumreach, Tnaot Chum
Tang Krasang	Prampir Meakkakra, Tang Krasang, Chheu Lving, Kokir Chuor, Tuol Chan, Chambak Khang Cheung, Sang Khleang, Thormmeak Neath, Sangkom Thmei, Veang Khang Cheung, Veang Khang Tboung
Ti Pou	Ti Pou, Nimit, Thmei, Ta Preach, Samraong, Chhuk Rumduol, Choam Thnanh, Phlong, Kbal Bei, Srae Srama, Trapeang Trom, Sen Akpiwat 1, Sen Akpiwat 2, Ou Thom
Tboung Krapeu	Pou Khav, Panhnha Chi, Ampuh, Chong Da, Kal Mekh
