= Ang Chan =

Ang Chan may refer to:

- Ang Chan I, king of Cambodia from 1516 to 1566
- Ang Chan II, king of Cambodia from 1806 to 1834
