= Preah Ang Chek Preah Ang Chorm shrine =

Religious shrine in Siem Reap, Cambodia

Coordinates: 13.3632°N 103.8586°E

Preah Ang Chek Preah Ang Chorm ព្រះអង្គចេក ព្រះអង្គចម
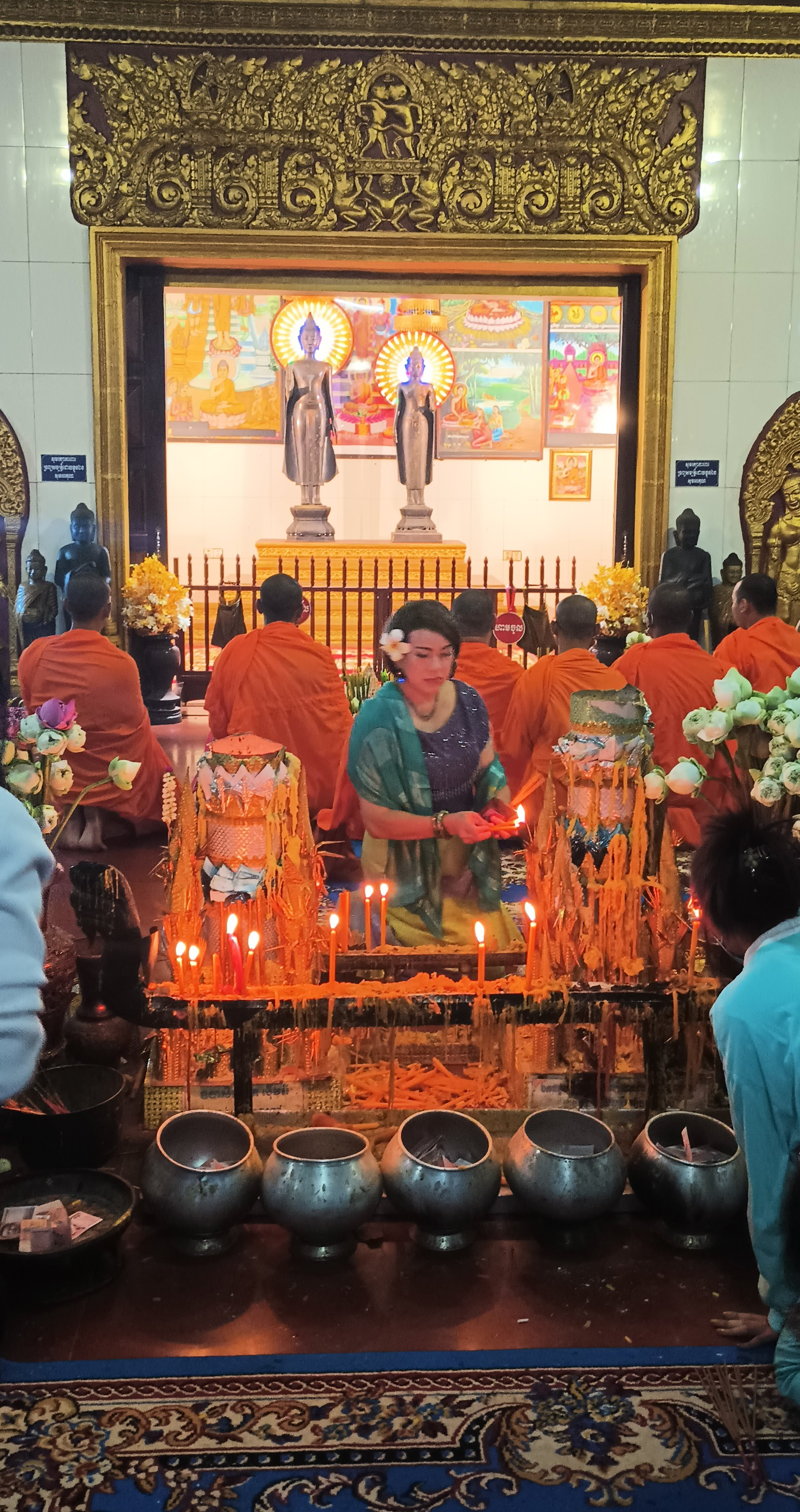

- Location within Cambodia

Religion
- Affiliation: Neak ta Theravada Buddhism

Location
- Location: Siem Reap
- Country: Cambodia

Architecture
- Completed: 1982

The Preah Ang Chek Preah Ang Chorm shrine (ព្រះអង្គចេក ព្រះអង្គចម) is a religious shrine in Siem Reap, Cambodia. It is located within the compound of the Royal Residence where two Buddha statues referred to as Preah Ang Chek and Preah Ang Chorm are worshipped since 1982.

== Etymology ==
The prefix Preah Ang (ព្រះអង្គ) refers to the dignity of both princesses. While Preah Ang Chek literally translates as Princess Banana in modern Khmer, it seems rather Chek and Chorm be interpreted as an abbreviation of royal titles such as Preah Chorm Chau (ព្រះចមចៅ), confirming their noble descent.

== History ==
=== Unknown origin of two Angkorian statues ===
The statues of Preah Ang Chek Preah Ang Chorm were both bronze statues rediscovered in 1950 in the forest around Angkor Thom by Angkor conservation officials. It is believed that the statues of Preah Ang Chek and Preah Ang Chorm were originally kept in the temple of Angkor Wat. According to the Institute of the Humanities and Social Sciences of the Royal Academy of Cambodia, Khmer king Ang Chan I or Chan Reachea who ascended the throne in the 16th century would have allowed the installation of the two bronze statues in Angkor Wat in honor of these two princesses, which were considered by then as bodhisattvas who received great honour and veneration. The statues were later lost as Angkor Wat was neglected.

=== Occult practices of Dap Chhuon ===
After learning that the statue of Preah Ang Chek and Preah Ang Chorm were being kept at the Conservation of Angkor, the infamous predator Dap Chhuon, who was governor of Siem Reap in the 1950s, along with some of his soldiers, raided and lored the two statues and kept them at his headquarters, nowadays the Angkor Century Hotel. The urban legend has it that only five soldiers putting their strength together were required to lift one of the statues. Using occult black magic, it is believed that Dap Chhuon could easily carry them both on his shoulders. He and his soldiers often spent at least half an hour a day worshiping and praying for before these statues.

It is believed that the two statues informed Dap Chhuon of the plans that Prince Norodom Sihanouk had to assassinate him after he was accused of participating in the "Bangkok Plot" which attempted to overthrow the monarchy. Deciding to flee to Thailand, he tried to take the statues away but was unable to as he had lost his magical powers.

After the execution of Dap Chhuon, the statues were seized and taken to the Provincial Department of Cults and Religious Affairs, where they were installed at the front of the building in a grand ceremony in 1958. As the Cambodian Civil War raged in Siem Reap, the two statues were moved to the nearby Wat Damnak in 1973.

=== Blown up by Pol Pot, or thrown into a pond? ===
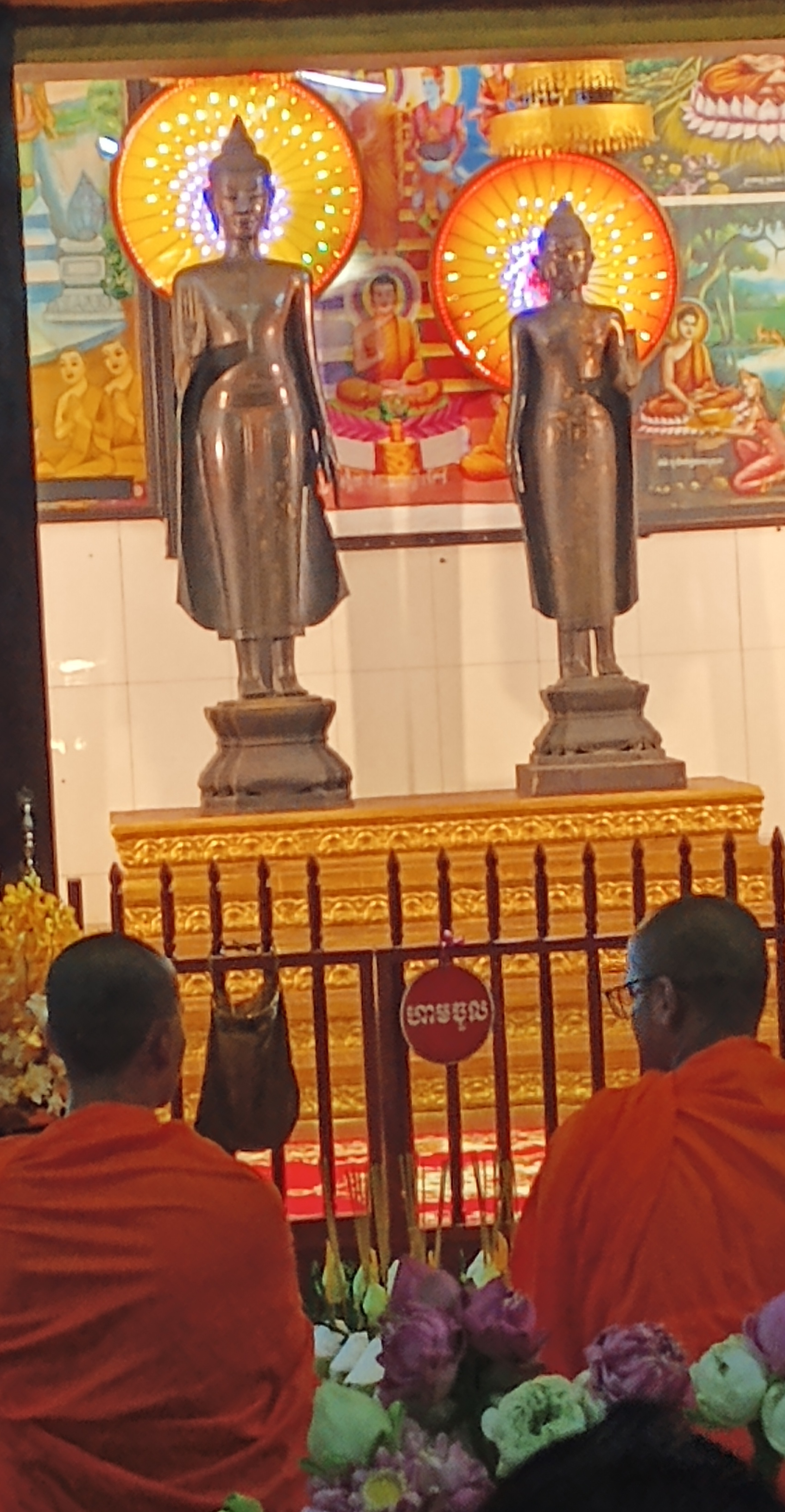
Preah Ang Chek and Preah Ang Chorn.

The two statues of Preah Ang Chek and Preah Ang Chorm were seriously damaged as they were blown up by the Khmers rouges troops of Pol Pot: it was an attempt to rid the people of Siem Reap from what they considered as superstition, according to Tep Vong, who lamented "the destruction of two bronze statues [...] carved by our forefathers in the Angkor Wat period." However, there are contradictory narratives as to the fate of the original statues as Youk Chhang claimed that the statues were instead thrown into a pond. In any case, some locals spread the rumour that the Khmer Rouge soldiers responsible for mistreating the statues, along with their commander, died of illness shortly after.

=== Restoring a cult ===
The cult of Preah Ang Chek and Preah Ang Chorm was eventually reintroduced with the supports of Buddhist monks and the province of Siem Reap.

According to the official version, the two statues were dredged from the bottom of the Siem Reap River and restored them to their previous home at Wat Damnak. In 1982, the construction of a shrine for the two statues referred to as "gold Buddhas" was started opposite Independence Gardens and the Grand Hotel d'Angkor.

Minister of Commerce Cham Prasidh contributed to the expansion and embellishment of the shrine in 2004.

== Ethics ==
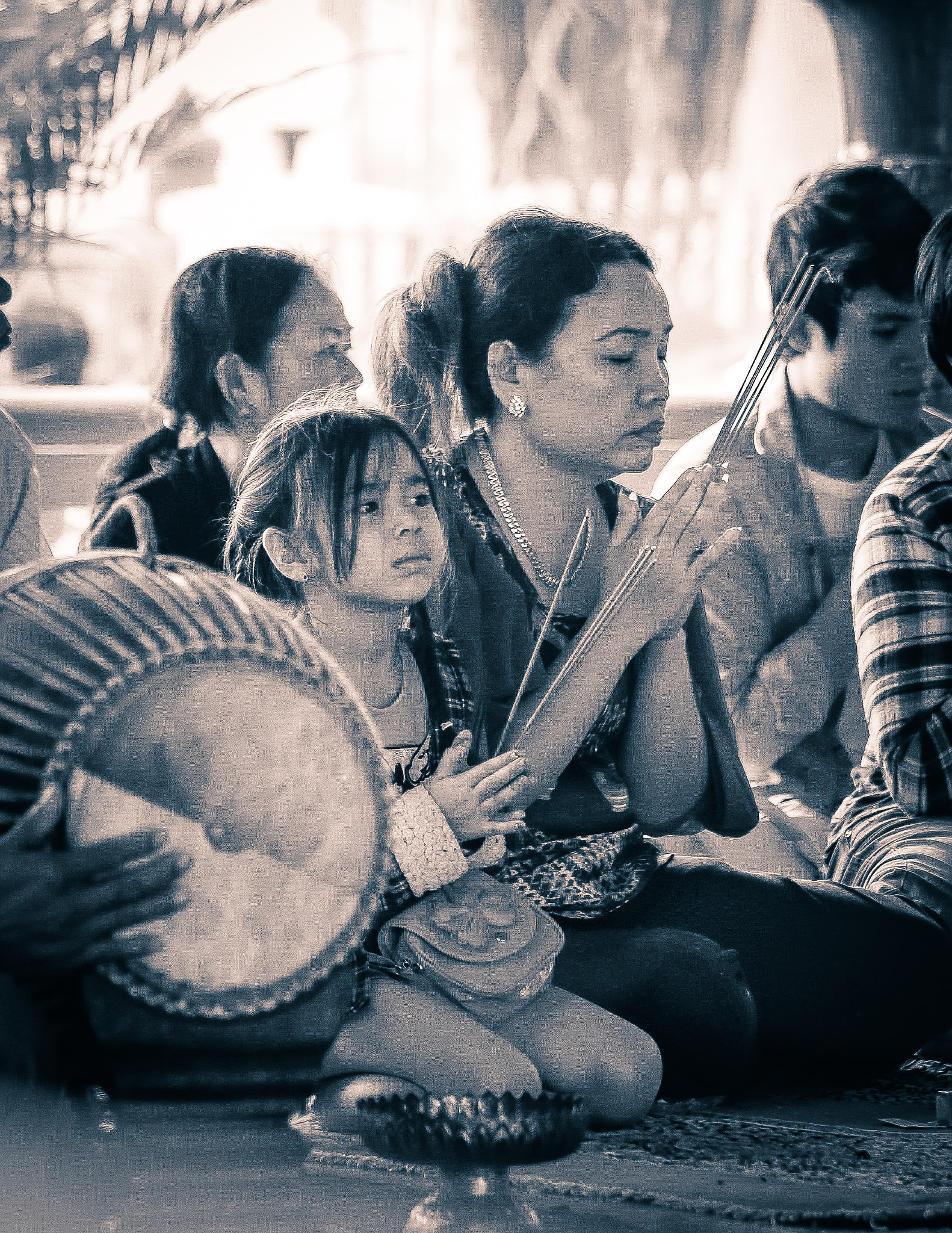
Offering incense to Preah Ang Chek and Preah Ang Chorm while traditional Khmer music is being played.

=== Khmer folklore: the tale of two sisters ===
Preah Ang Chek and Preah Ang Chom are believed to be "two magical sisters" or rather neak ta who are believed to answer the prayers of those who make offerings. According to the Institute of the Humanities and Social Sciences of the Royal Academy of Cambodia, Preah Ang Chek and Preah Ang Chom were daughters of Suryavarman II, the founder of Angkor Wat. While Suryavarman II built Angkor Wat as a shrine dedicated to Vishnu, modern folklore believes that the two sisters would have been devotees of Theravada Buddhism.

=== Neak ta Oun Nuy, a Phnom Penh relative ===
Preah Ang Chek and Preah Ang Chom are supposedly somehow related to another neak ta Oun Nuy whose cult is located in Wat Sansam Kosal in Phnom Penh. Oun Nuy, who is presented as a victorious commander in the army of Jayavarman VII, was condemned to live for ever as an neak ta after he lost a wager with the two celebrated sisters Preah Ang Chek and Preah Ang Cham, which is not coherent with historical chronology. The medium of the neak ta Oun Nuy claims to have informed Norodom Ranariddh to flee before the 1997 Cambodian coup d'état as Preah Ang Chek and Preah Ang Chom had informed Dap Chhuon fifty years before.

== Practice ==
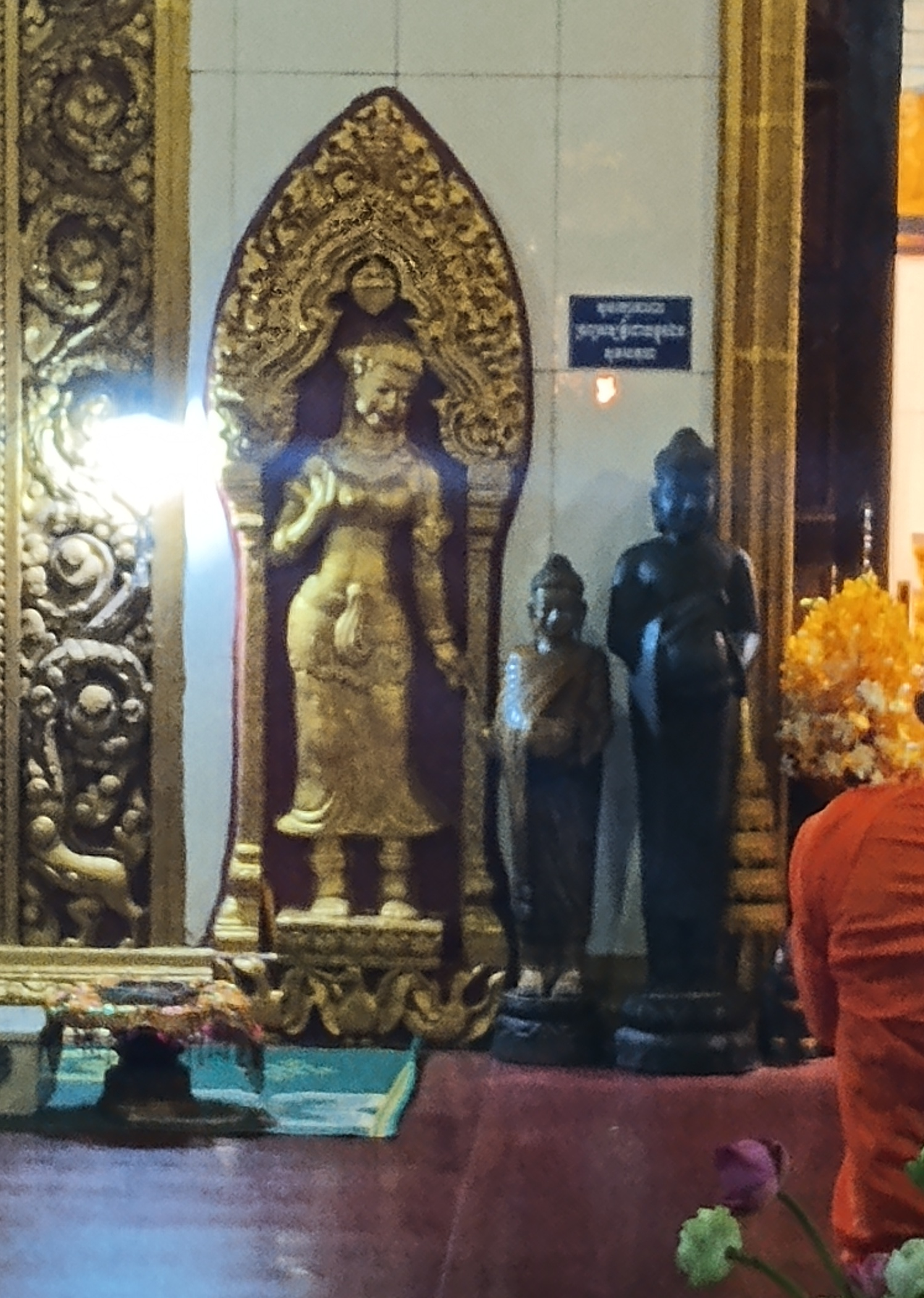
Other figures inside shrine.

=== Lotus flower offerings to the spiritual protector of Siem Reap ===
Devotees of the shrine believe that Preah Ang Chek and Preah Ang Chorm bring good fortune to the newly married, and provide spiritual protection for Siem Reap. An average of about 300 people come daily to offer candles, incense sticks and lotus flowers, but on special days like Pchum Ben, the Khmer New Year and Bon Om Touk, more than 800 people will come and visit.

=== Traditional music ===
Every day, traditional pin piet ensembles accompany the devotion of the faithful.
