= The Royal Residence =

- ព្រះរាជដំណាក់
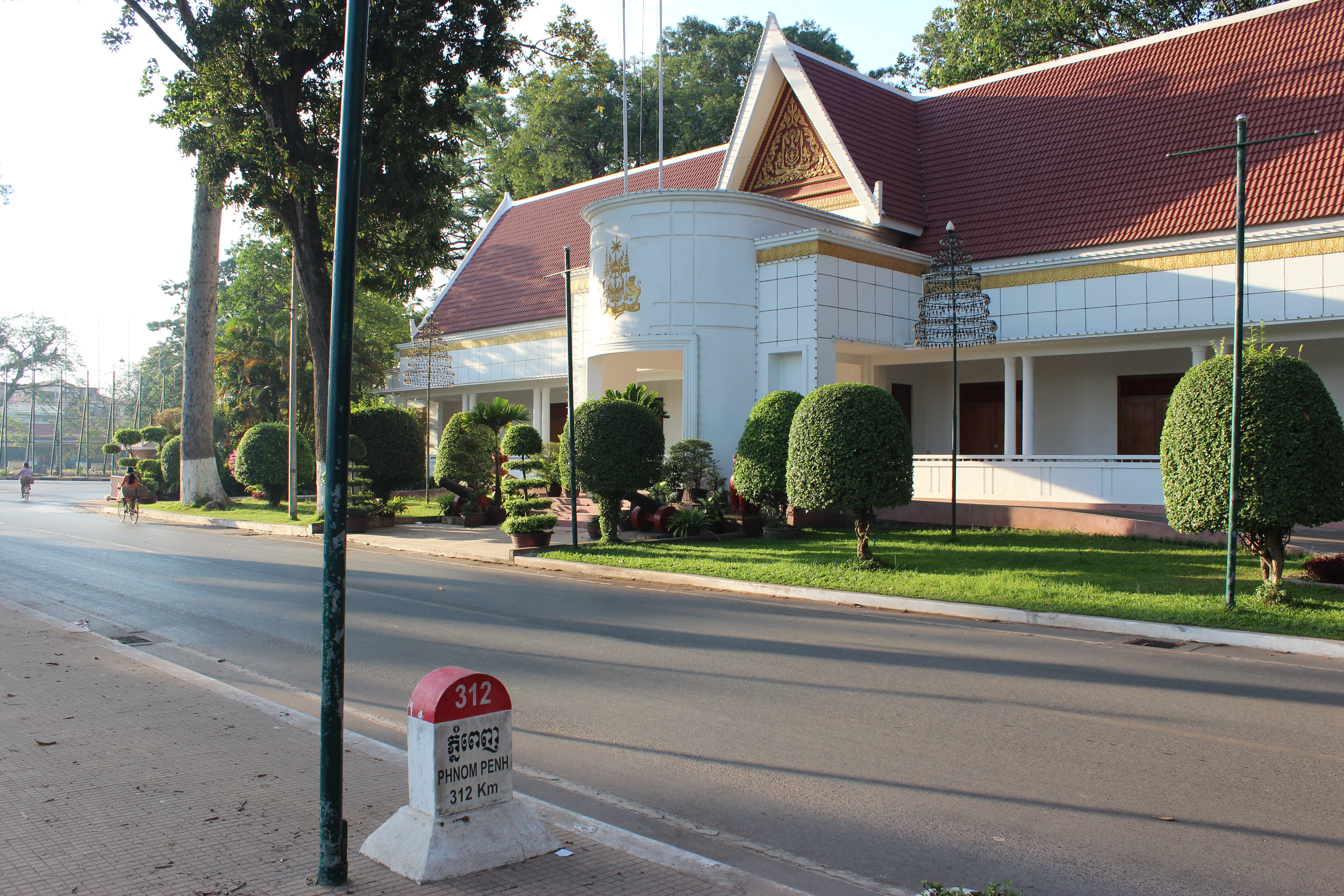
- View of The Royal Residence
- Interactive map of the The Royal Residence area

General information
- Architectural style: Khmer
- Location: National Road (NR) 6, Krong Siem Reap, Cambodia
- Coordinates: 13°21′42″N 103°51′32″E
- Construction started: 1904

The Royal Residence (Khmer: ព្រះរាជដំណាក់, Preăh Réachôdâmnăk) is a royal villa located in Siem Reap, Cambodia. It serves as the official residence for the King of Cambodia for when he visits Siem Reap.

== History ==
According to Siem Reap's provincial information department, the villa was constructed in 1904.

During the French protectorate period, it became an important site for former King Norodom Sihanouk, who was said to have used the residence to plan and launch his bid for Cambodia's independence from France in the 1950s.

In the 1990s, the villa was used by King Sihanouk to host various political figures, primarily for peace talks, amid Cambodia's political developments, including meetings with Prime Minister Hun Sen, Prince Norodom Ranariddh, opposition politician Sam Rainsy and foreign diplomats.

On 18 February 2017, King Norodom Sihamoni hosted actress Angelina Jolie and her family at the residence. Jolie was in Siem Reap at the time for the world premiere of First They Killed My Father of which she served as the director and Sihamoni as a film patron.

In late December 2022, 12 copper statues that were commissioned by the Ministry of the Royal Palace commemorating military leaders from the Khmer Empire era was officially unveiled outside the residence, with King Sihamoni having inspected the new installations shortly thereafter.

On the night of 12 March 2023, a major fire broke out due to an apparent electrical fault, which damaged parts of the royal residence complex, specifically the adjacent building which serves as the office quarters of the King, though the main residential building was not affected. Officials have pledged to rebuild the structure with works having already commenced.

== The Royal Residence today ==
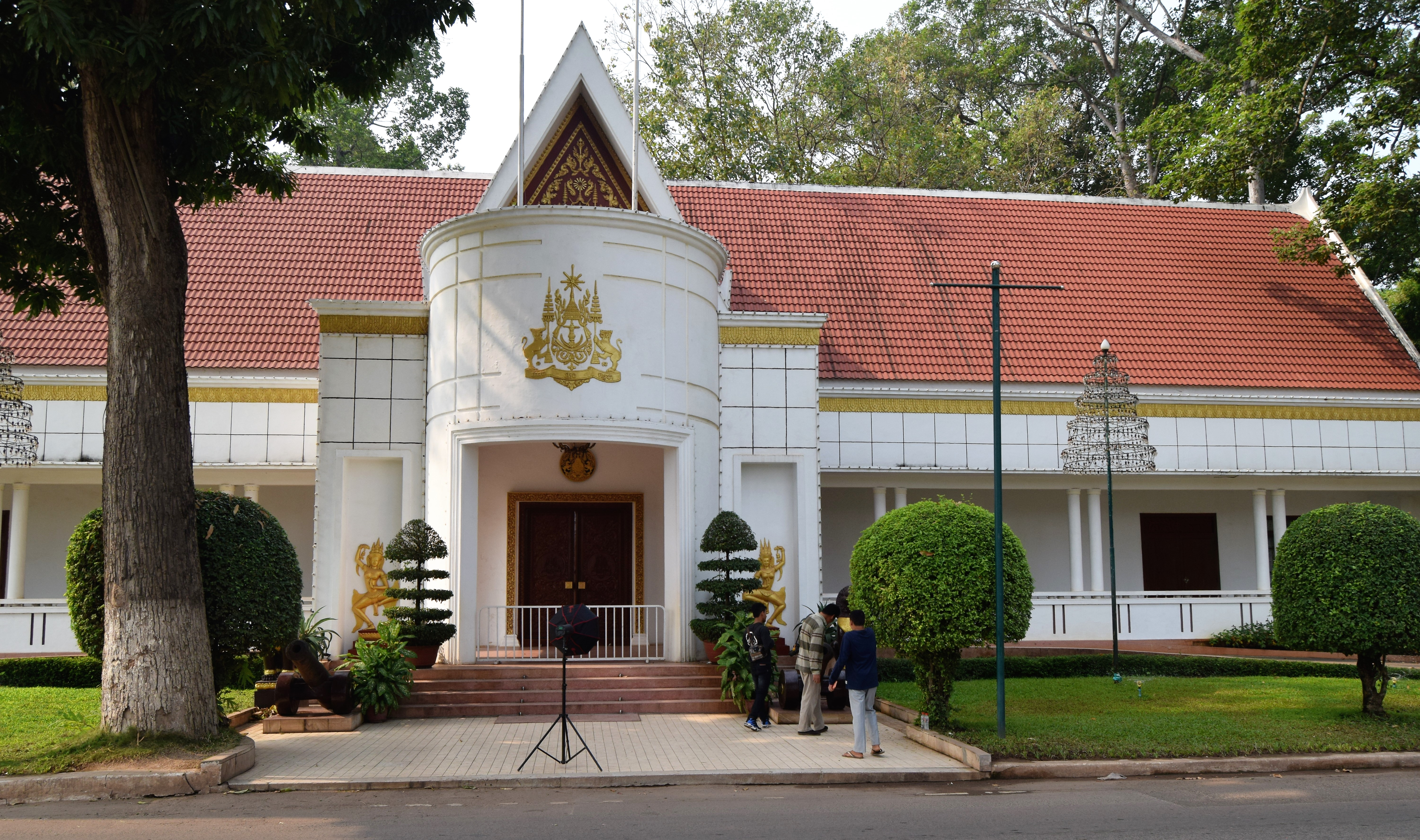
Members of the public are seen outside the Royal Residence.

Apart from being the official secondary royal residence for the Cambodian monarch, the villa is a frequented local site and tourist attraction in Siem Reap, although direct physical entry is not permitted by members of the public. However, it can be viewed from the exterior, with the adjoining Royal Independence Gardens being publicly accessible.

The nearby King Master Statue and Preah Ang Chek Preah Ang Chorm shrine, which are both locally revered and religiously significant can be publicly accessed as well, though only at during certain intervals of the day. This is due to the construction of a taller, larger fencing with gates that now surrounds the outer royal compound in addition to the smaller one that had already pre-existed as part of the inner compound.
