= Phnom Santuk =

Mountain in Cambodia

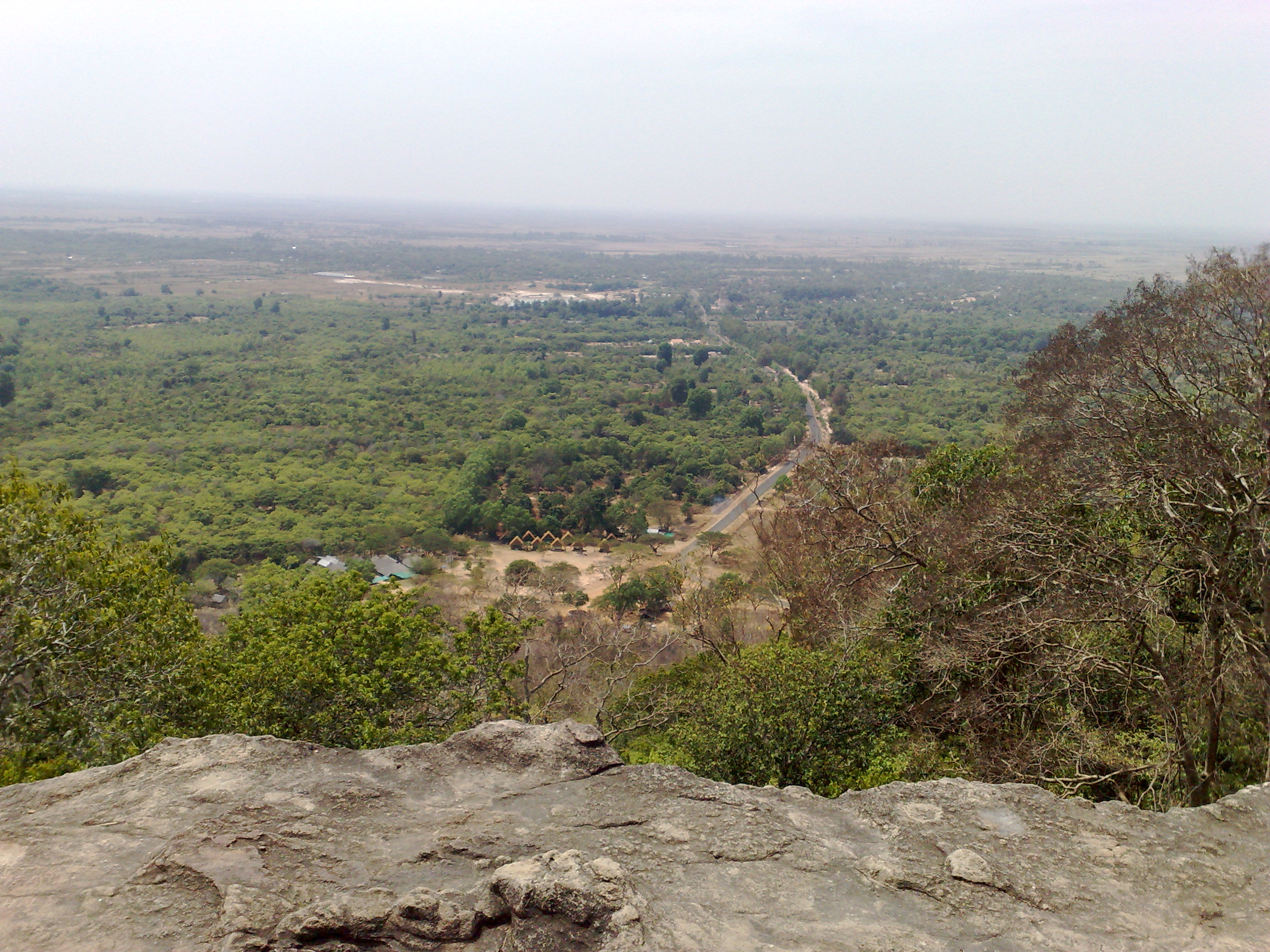
- View of the valley below Mount Phnom Santuk

Highest point
- Elevation: 207 m (679 ft)
- Coordinates: 12°38′N 105°00′E

Geography
- Location within Cambodia
- Location: Santuk, Kampong Thom, Cambodia

Phnom Santuk (Khmer: ភ្នំសន្ទុក) is a hill and cultural site in the Cambodian province of Kampong Thom. Located in Ko Koh village, Ko Koh commune, Santuk District, it is the most sacred mountain of the province. The summit is accessed by a stone pathway with many statues flanking the way. At the top is a white-walled temple and many shrines and deities, including several reclining Buddhas made out of rock, measuring more than 33 feet (10 m) in length. Monks inhabit the site.

== Etiology ==
Phnom Santuk appears in the epic legend of Baksei Chamkrong. When the general Ta Moeng welcomes Baksei Chamkrong and Tak He who are fleeing from Angkor, he provides them with shelter and feeds them out of pity. He goes out to collect rice, water, fish, meat and leave it to Tak He as food for the trip. In the legend, the narrator etiologically explains that the place was a place of refuge at a mountain of despair and is therefore known as Phnom Asontuk (Khmer: ភ្នំអាសន្នទុក្ខ) or in the abridged version, Phnom Santuk.

== Geography ==
Phnom Santuk is a hill of 679 feet (207 m) elevation, which rises above the Tonlé Sap River valley. The summit can be reached either by climbing 809 steps, or via a paved road, 2.5 kilometres (1.6 mi) in length. Vistas of Tonlé Sap valley can be observed from the peak, with sunset views over the rice fields considered to be a major tourist attraction. Phnom Srah Kmao, located next to Phnom Tantuk, contains a brick temple and bat cave.

== History ==
According to the Cambodian Royal Chronicles, around 1496 AD, King Thommo Reachea I arranged the transfer of Buddha relics from Preah Thong’s stupa at Angkor to a new home in the village of Khvav Brah Dhatu near Phnom Santuk, Kompong Thom.

Preah Thamma Vipassana Kong served as chief monk in the late 18th century.

During the Cambodian Civil War, Phnom Santuk marked the furthest advance into the north-east by the US-backed Khmer Republic's forces, in September 1971 during the Operation Chenla II offensive.

== Features ==
There are many Buddha images and pagodas enshrined along the way to the peak. New wats in prasat style are under construction near the hilltop. Nagas (serpent figures) and dragons are carved in profusion on these wats. Below the southern peak, at the base of the trees, there are many reclining Buddhas, some carved in rock in the earlier times and a few others are made of concrete in recent times. The multi-storied Chinese pagoda has a number of figurines made in porcelain. A panirvana sculpture, carved in rock of Buddha of the Theravada Buddhism period, dates to the sixteenth century. It is similar to the one found carved on a boulder in Prea Ang Thong, and is also seen in the holy hill of Phnom Santuk. Nature-based tourism is available at the Phnom Santuk Resort.

== Culture ==
The protector deity of the mountain is known as Neak ta Kraham Ka, who lived during the feudal period of Kompong Thong, under the feudal ruler Decho Borara’a Thipadei Meas. Phnom Santuk is a pilgrimage site. Worship is offered in the wats on the hill and there are seven monks who perform this service.
