= Santuk Silk Farm =

Santuk Silk Farm is a silk farm, located about 11 miles (18km) southeast of Kampong Thom City, Cambodia, near the village of Kakaoh. The farm, established by Vietnam War veteran Bud Gibbons in 2006, demonstrates the process of the silk worm, from its earliest stages, from egg to cocoon. The farm employs some 15 girls to weave the raw silk into thread; they make scarves and other items, sold in the shop on site.
