= Neak ta =

Ancestral spirits worshipped in Cambodia

A neak ta (Khmer: អ្នកតា, 'nâk ta) is a Cambodian ancestral or tutelary deity, believed locally to watch over people, places, and things, as long as they are paid proper respect.

Neak ta in Khmer translates as the ancestor. A neak ta can be either feminine or masculine, and most often they operate as a couple.

== History ==
=== Origin: an ancestral worship of nature ===
Though the origins of the neak ta lose themselves in the night of time, they are believed to originate in a certain worship of nature. The cult of the neak ta may be regarded as a foundational layer upon which later traditions have been overlaid. The cult of the neak ta contains primitive religious elements, such as lacking dogma and a priesthood, as it preceded both Hinduism and Buddhism in Cambodia.

=== Neak ta at Angkor: the influence of the devaraja ===
In the Angkorian period, the worship of the devaraja as kamraten jagat, protective genius linked to dynasties and places can be seen as new valorisation of the ruling king of his own neak ta.

The veneration of neak ta is still present among the ancient Khmer Empire outside of the contemporary borders of Cambodia, as these neak ta rituals have been observed among the Khmer Surin in Thailand and the Khmer Krom in Vietnam. In Laos, phìbàn (ຜີບ້ານ) are Laotian equivalents of the neak ta, although the phìbàn are geographically more specific and functionally less well-defined.

After the fall of Angkor, King Ang Chan I (1510–1560) also known as Preah Baromei is associated with the elevation of the most famous neak ta Khleang Moeung in Pursat.

In his footsteps, King Ang Chan II (1806–1834) ordered that neak ta Sengha and neak ta Preah Ind be brought to a monastery voat Phnom Kngok Meas near Kampong Chhnang to ensure its prosperity.

=== King Sisowath, land reform and the replacement of the neak ta by the State ===
Until the XIXth century, insofar as the land belonged to anyone, it belonged to the spirits of the ancestors neak ta. Neak ta were mired in networks of protection, placation and patronage that resembled those tying governors and particular fiefdom. However, new administrative policies enacted in Cambodia during the late nineteenth century and early twentieth century sought to shift this traditional "galactic" arrangement of power to one in which the central government had tighter control over outlying regions. Neak ta were also feared as a backward-dragging superstition rather than a challenge to state authority during the French protectorate of Cambodia. When the King Sisowath's Prime Ministry Thiounn drafted the initial blueprint for the territorial reform of Cambodia in 1908, he included among the role of the new state appointed religious adviser (preah dhammakar) the mission to "arrange ceremonial materials" to praise the village neak ta. However, this role did not appear in the 1908 royal ordinance as the role of the neak ta was replaced by the modern bureaucratic génie of the state.

=== Khmers Rouges: the replacement of the neak ta by the Angkar as master of water and of the earth ===
In official or private propaganda under the Khmers Rouges regime, little mention is made of the neak ta — they were ignored, but sometimes also destroyed as in the case of Preah Ang Chek Preah Ang Chorm. Uprooting the belief in the neak ta from the Khmer soul, young Khmers Rouge soldiers did not deny their existence but realized their inefficacy. The message that "Angkar is the master of the water and of the earth" (angkar mchah teuk, mchah dey) demonstrated a great contrast with activities of the earlier Issarak movement, which tried to gain control over villages by "endowing new neak ta".

=== Kingdom of Cambodia (1991 - present): local identity, diminished power and survival of the neak ta ===
In the aftermath of the Khmer rouges and with the development of Cambodia, the local neak ta are said to be no longer as demanding or as potent as they used to be, while efforts have been made to restore elements of their cult and worship. The frequent movements of population after 1975 severed the link between villagers and their ancestors. In consequence, belief in the whole panoply of autochthonous mythological beings, including the tutelary spirits began to disintegrate. However, some neak ta spirit cults grew in importance once again away from the control of Buddhist monks and lay specialists as it was observed in Kep.

Leaving the neak ta has been a vexing experience for the Khmer diaspora. Despite considering the possibility that the neak ta may relocate, the migration of Khmer diaspora outside of Cambodia has been particularly vexing in terms of territorial spirits who protect a certain place.

== Rituals ==
Neak ta believers try to control what happens to them through the use of rituals, amulets, and offerings. Despite some similarities, the rituals vary from one neak ta to another.

=== Neak ta Houses ===
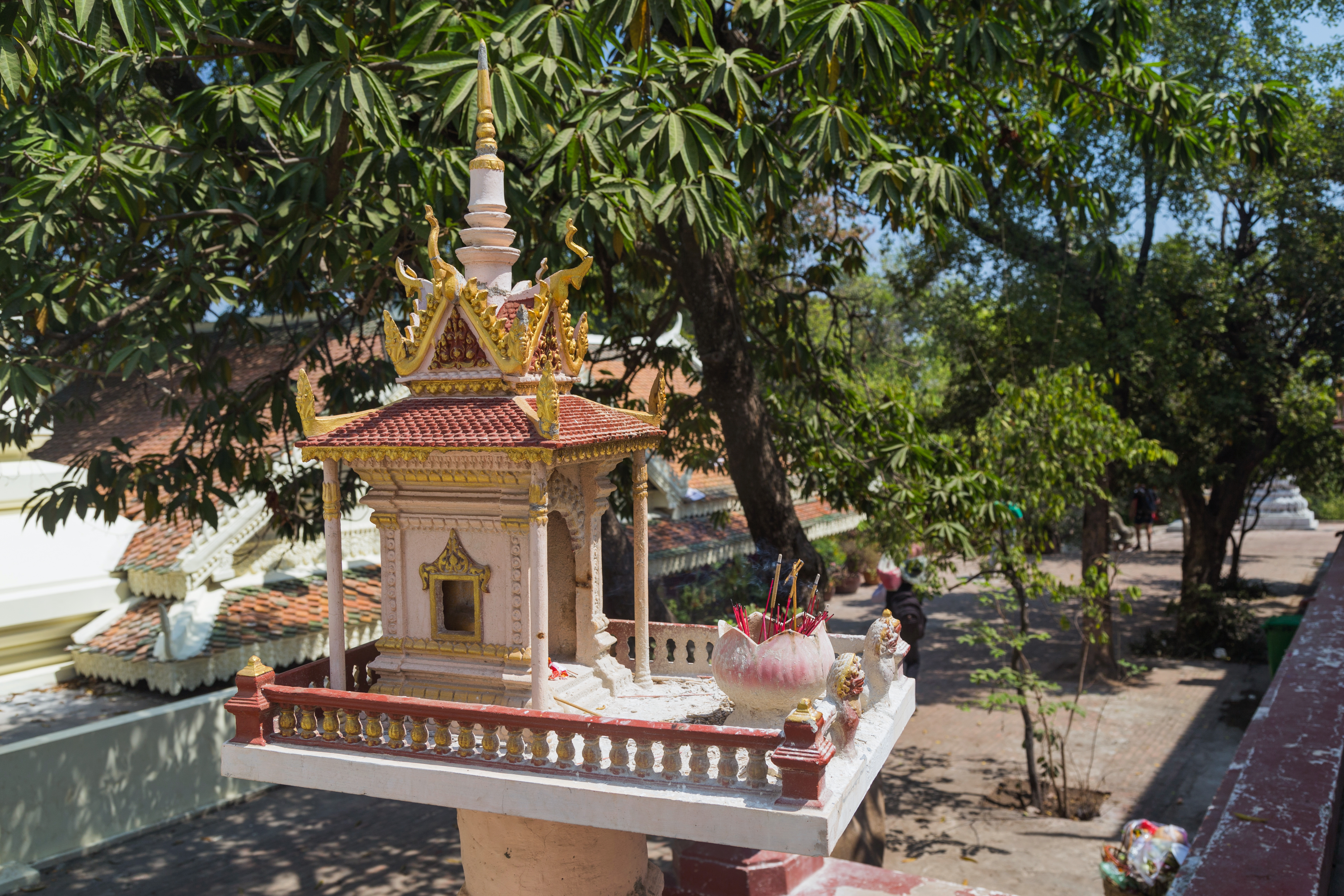
House of a neak ta on Wat Phnom.

To honour a neak ta, local villagers will usually set up altars near large trees as miniature cabins suspended from a branch or mounted upon a post and in which they are then reputed to reside in the form of roots, stones, fragments of sculpture or without any visible form.

=== Officiants: achar, kru khmer and boramei ===
While the achar is the ritual master of ceremonies for rites related to the neak ta, the Buddhist monks will only take part in the recitation of prayers and not as officiants.

The Kru Khmer is a shaman who specializes in the rituals of neak ta. A Khmer Kru is normally a man who specializes in "herbal medicine, preparation of amulets and talismans, black magic, or meditation". He is able to distinguish which spirit, whether a neak ta or another evil spirit, is causing harm and bring about healing by recommending a course of action to appease the offended spirit.

For more obvious cases affecting the psychosis, mostly female mediums called kru boramei or rup are sought out. Boramei medium are mediums that allow the neak taor boramei spirits to directly interact with the seekers. Unlike kru khmer who train to become an expert, kru boramei is thought to be chosen by the boramei spirits themselves to serve as their mediums.

=== Rites: promises, prophylactic prayers and annual allegiances ===
Rituals associated with the neak ta may be simple blessing vows, formal ceremonies, or the monastic recitation of parittas protective verses either a prophylactic supplication or to counteract serious difficulties such as major illnesses, famine and accidents.

The first type of rite is a vow or promise (ban sran) performed to gain a blessing for a minor undertaking or to find a missing object.

The second (bon banchan neak ta) is a more formal prophylactic ceremony designed to counteract more serious difficulties, such as major illnesses, famine, or drought. It involves an officiant (rup) and an orchestra.

The final category (bon banchan neak tà oy sok sabai) is reserved for neak ta with a regional or national significance. Also known as "raising up the ancestors" (leung neak ta) it is a rite associated with ensuring the next harvest. It generally takes place annually as a form of feudal allegiance in January–February and is oriented toward general protection, health, and peace throughout the coming year.

=== Offerings: from human sacrifice to symbolic vegetal offerings ===
The primary way in which the neak ta believers worship is to offer food, flowers, incense, and alcohol at the neak ta spirit house. Most often, the offerings will include a pair of sla thor, two bowls of perfumed water, five candles and five incense sticks. The sla thor is a banana tree cut to approximately 15 centimeters supported by three bamboo shoots. The sla thor dong is also common and made with a coconut symbolizing the womb of new birth. An areca nut is placed on top. The five candles and five incense sticks represent the five directions of space which the neak ta is to protect: four cardinal directions and the zenith. Added to this, other offerings such as bay sei, cigarettes, sampot and other offerings can be made ad libitum.

Ritual specialists kru khmer have traditionally used herbal remedies, astrology, fortune-telling, magic, sorcery, and talismans to both access the neak ta spirit world and to provide protection from it.

A number of neak ta were offered wild and domestic animal sacrifices until quite recently. Neak ta Mno of Voat Vihear Suor received both a crocodile and a monkey, while neak ta Tenon of Kandal Stieng had a monkey.

Human sacrifices to neak ta Me Sar took place at Ba Phnom as late as 1884. It seems that the neak ta Krol of Kompong Thom may have received human sacrifices until 1904.

=== Music ===
Music is the first and most important offering in any rite involving a neak ta. It is always traditional Khmer music. Music helps to lead the boramei or rup into being possessed by the neak ta. The anthuot is used in the invocation of the neak ta before leaving in search for the choar rung (saps) and precious wood khlemm chann.

== Functions of the neak ta ==
=== Social function: neak ta as the cement of village unity ===
With the neak ta being associated with single villages in Cambodia, the neak ta were traditionally a constitutive element of village unity as the annual rite of laeng neak ta would serve to reaffirm loyalty toward one another and reinforce mutual links within the community.

=== Religious function: protection and blessing ===
Neak ta are invoked by Khmer villagers to ask for rain at the right time, watch over the rice paddies, protect the village from pandemics and the ills of war. The protection of the neak ta is limited to the srok village. Neak ta are invoked to recover lost objects and animals, recover good health.

=== Judicial function: swearing in court ===
Today, oaths at court are still sworn not to the state or before the image of the Buddha, but in the presence of the neak ta. Defendants are called to swear to tell the truth not to some abstract moral standard against Buddhist scriptures, but before the very real fear of retribution by neak ta that they will not lie – a custom iconized most recently in the commission and erection of a statue of a prominent neak ta, Lok Ta Dambon-daek (Iron Rod) outside the Khmer Rouge Tribunal in 2006.

=== Travel: neak ta as guardian of the road ===
Some neak ta are installed close to the road so as to protect travellers who may stop by to venerate them and make offerings. Such is the case of Yey Mau on the National Highway 4 between Phnom Penh and Kampot. Thus, cars driving can be seen throwing money at the neak ta Chomteav Mau.

== Typology ==
=== Status of the neak ta: neak ta couples and solitary neak ta ===
The neak ta are often represented as a couple of ancestors, which is also sometimes associated to a Brahmanical deity and its shakti.

Neak ta spirits can also be solitary individuals (cah srok) "the old one of the country," indicating the archaic nature of their cult. A powerful neak tà called Toeuk Lic, for example, dwells in an Angkorian-period Buddha statue now placed at the foot of the cascade on Phnom Kulen.

=== Hierarchy: a spiritual galaxy ===
The world of neak ta in Angkor was hierarchical, and a mirror image of Khmer society. A powerful neak ta tends to supervise and order minor neak ta.

=== Types ===
==== Natural phenomenon ====
Neak ta can be associated with various natural phenomena such as a tree (Neak ta dam), a mountain (Neak ta Phnom) or a river or pond (Neak ta Tuk).

==== Brahmanical deity ====
A certain number of neak ta have taken form in statues of Brahmanical divinities.

Reinterpretation of Brahmanical divinities as neak ta by local Khmer villagers often comes with renaming without necessarily keeping trace of their theogony: Ganesh becomes Neak ta Pum Saen or Neak Ta Gones, Indra becomes Neak ta Preah Ind, Kali becomes Yey Khmau or Black Lady and Shiva becomes Neak ta Ko Krohom, literally "red-neck" or Neak ta Kanghar Daek, which means the "steel of wheel" one of the attributes of Shiva.

===== Neak ta Siddhi-Suost =====
Neak Ta Siddhi-Suost is the most significant neak ta derived from Brahmanical deities who is sometimes considered as a national protector.

===== Me Sa, white mother of Ba Phnom =====
Me Sa, the white mother of Ba Phnom can be traced back to Hindu mythology. Her name is probably a contraction of the Sanskrit Mahishasura, thus revealing her true identity as Durga or Mahisasuramardini, the destroyer of the buffalo demon Mahishasura. It is known that ritual suicide and probable human sacrifice were linked to goddess cults practiced in the Indian Pallava kingdom of the seventh through ninth centuries. It is possible that such rites were exported to Cambodia, for the last human sacrifice in the country took place at Ba Phnom in April or May 1877.

==== National heroes: Neak ta Khleang Moeung ====
Some national heroes have been raised to the level of neak ta deities. Khleang Moeung is the most famous neak ta in the country with this heroic origin. The physical representation of Khleang Moeung has evolved. In the 2000s, his statue was that of a man of previous era with square shoulders and a bushy moustache — his representation maybe denoting a trace of Siamese influence. But the more recent statue portrays him as a modern-looking man.

According to tradition, the propitiation of neak ta Khleang Moeung once involved the sacrifice of a male buffalo in each province of the kingdom.

When Cambodia gained independence, Sihanouk had an enclosure built around Khleang Moeung's statue. It was broken up and thrown into a nearby pond during the Pol Pot era but has now been recovered and reconstituted Sam Rainsy brought up the tale of Khleang Moeung, using the version of the story reported by French researcher Adhémar Leclère in 1914, and criticizing King Kan, whom Prime Minister Hun Sen is known to admire and who, according to some versions of history, was not of royal blood.

== Ethics of neak ta worship ==
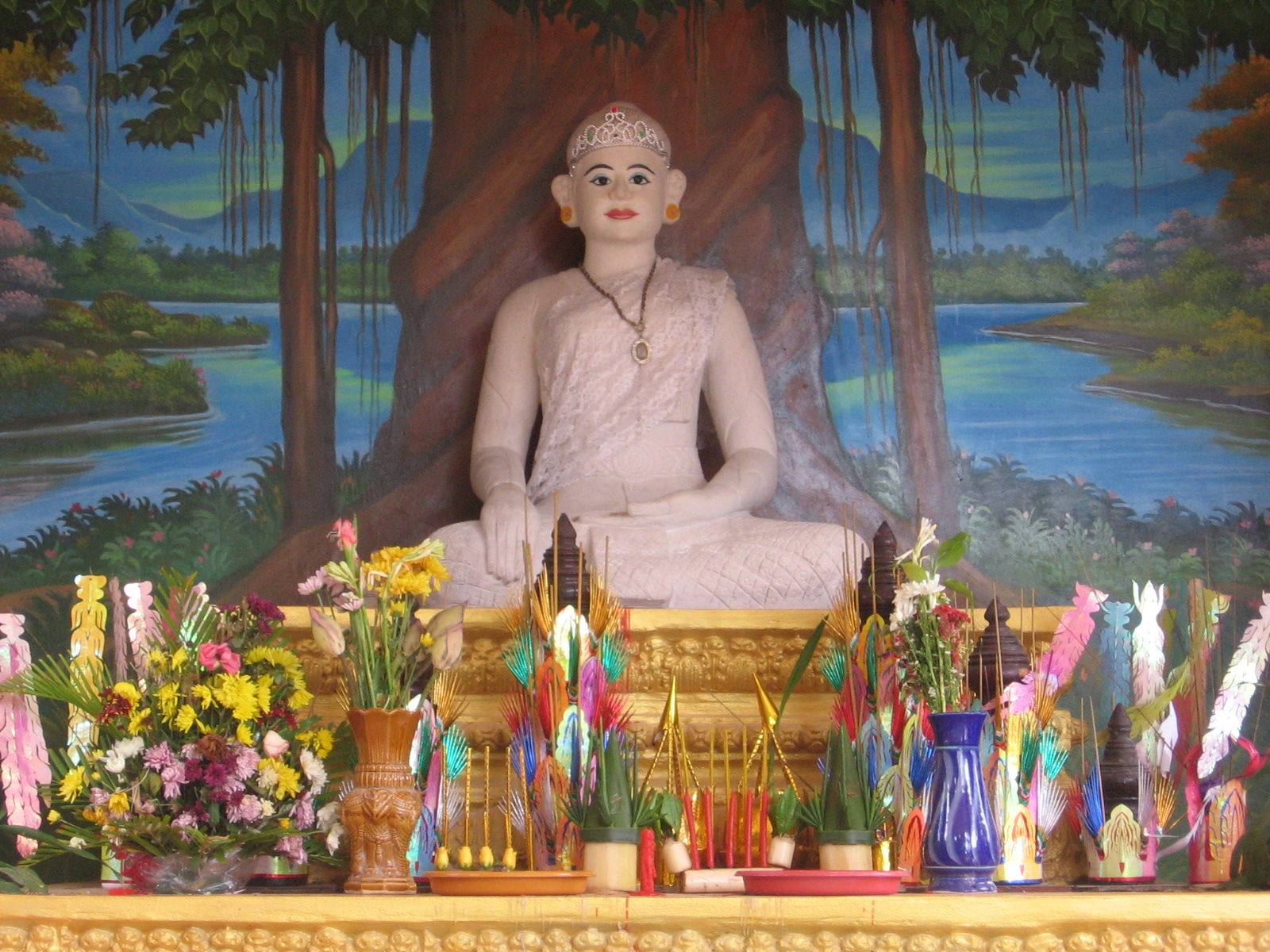
Altar to Yeay Mao in Riem Pagoda, Sihanoukville.

Various religious traditions in Cambodia take various stances as to the ethics of the worship of the neak ta.

=== Animism: neak ta and the religion of the land ===
According to Paul Mus' pioneer study of 1933, the neak ta are representative of what he called the "true Asian religion, that of the land". Cults to neak ta have deeply influenced over time the way Hinduism in its various expressions and then Buddhism has been interpreted and practiced in ancient, modern and contemporary Cambodia.

=== Buddhism: neak ta and the dual organization of Theravada Buddhism ===
In Theravada Buddhists societies, the neak ta and the Buddhist sangha are two religious systems side by side, which are kept clearly apart in theory and served by different religious specialists but are used simultaneously and are viewed by them as complementary and interdependent. This duality is present in Cambodia as well as other countries in SouthEast Asia. The Burmese pay homage to the Buddha and worship the nats, the Thai have their phi and their Lak Mueang temples, the Lao also worship phi and the Cambodians the neak ta in addition to the Buddha.

Statues of the neak ta are regularly installed inside monastic enclosures. Some have even been discovered and solemnly introduced by the abbots of monasteries. One can often find a neak ta in the northeast corner of the grounds of a pagoda.

Some neak ta rituals transpire the influence of Buddhism especially where offerings of meat and alcohol have been suppressed.

According to Alain Forest, neak ta represent the only figures of pardon in Theravada Buddhism as practiced in Cambodia. Though a neak ta "cannot intervene in the process of final salvation, but they may be induced to bring about significant change in the human and physical realms" and thereby help humans in their daily living.

=== The growing influence of Chinese rites on the neak ta ===
Chinese immigration to Cambodia has influenced the worship of the neak ta. While the Chinese and Vietnamese can pay respect to the neak ta in Cambodia, and even contribute to the costs of restructuring their temple huts, the Khmer would never honor a Chinese or Vietnamese spirit.

The Sam Orng Chinese temple along the banks of the Tonle Bassac river to the Monivong Bridge was built in 1929 and it celebrates an annual festival in honour of neak ta Hei at the end of the Chinese New Year.

In some places, Chinese deities are even replacing the Khmer neak ta. The most clear example is on Voat Phnom in Phnom Penh. Though for centuries Voat Phnom was a shrine to a Khmer neak ta called 'Preah Chao', it has recently fallen under a Chinese spirit worship. When the Khmer Rouge occupied Phnom Penh in 1975, they gathered all the statues of gods and goddesses in Chinese temples all over the city, and they brought them to the Voat Phnom. In 1982, three years after the collapse of the regime, Chinese descendants returned to collect the statues and bring them back to the temples around the city, but two were left behind – the statues of Xuanzang, the sacred monk from the famous Chinese novel Journey to the West, and Tudigong, the Chinese god of earth.

=== Islam: the neak ta of the Cham Sot ===
Traditional Muslims of Cambodia known as Cham Sot may practice ceremonies of possession (chai) portraying the neak chai, or spirits of the ancient kings of Champa, which correspond closely with the Khmer animist worship of the neak ta, or ancestor spirits. The neak ta Leak in Prey Veng Province is of Cham origin and therefore associated to Islam though it rules over a Buddhist village, it forbids its protected kon chau from eating pork punishing those who would with stomach aches. These practises however are the subject of unanimous condemnation from orthodox Muslims.

=== Christianity: from rejection of idolatry to pastoral care and popular piety for the Virgin Mary ===
Christians in Cambodia consider the neak ta as a form of idolatry. Ethnologists have seen striking similarities between the discourse of the neak ta Yeay Tep or "ancestral goddess" who wants to "come and save humanity" with the discourse of missionaries concerning the Virgin Mary. In fact, the miraculous discovery in 2008 of a statue of the Virgin Mary which had been thrown into the river by the Khmer Rouges has developed a local devotion to the Virgin Mary in Areyksat.

=== Neak ta and modernity ===
Since the 1960s, it has been observed that the influence of the neak ta on the villagers and the respect shown to them is decreasing. With the development and education of Cambodia, many Khmers have stopped worshipping the neak ta and turned towards future-oriented, pragmatic ideologies that they see as 'modern'.

=== Environment and the neak ta: from clearing land to deforestation ===
The cult of the neak ta provides insights about the way people in Cambodia relate to the environment, as well as the notions of development, progress and civilisation that are now driving a certain peril to both culture and biodiversity. The origin of the neak ta was often linked to land clearing and cutting down trees to expand human activity such as rice paddies: the elevation of a neak ta would mark the separation between the srok village where humans live and the prey forest which was the realm of the spirits. The economic development of Cambodia has led to urban development, water pollution, deforestation and mountain exploitation for quarries which have caused a certain desertion of Cambodian spirits as well as a certain concern of the population. The vanishing influence of neak ta on Khmer mentaities no longer curbs excesses of human behaviour through fear of punishment by particular neak ta spirits. While the religious respect that can be shown to elements of nature is disappearing, animal cruelty linked to blood sacrifices is also diminishing.

== See also ==
- Nat (deity)

== Bibliography ==
- Souyris-Rolland, André (1951). "Contribution a l'étude du culte des génies tutélaires ou "Neak Ta" chez les Cambodgiens du Sud". Bulletin de la Société des études indochinoises. II: 160–173.
- Choulean, Ang (2002). People and Earth. Art Media Resources Limited. ISBN 978-1-58886-040-8.
- Work, Courtney (January 2019). "Chthonic Sovereigns? 'Neak Ta' in a Cambodian Village". The Asia Pacific Journal of Anthropology. 20 (1): 74–95. doi:10.1080/14442213.2018.1553205. S2CID 150961902.
- Harris, Ian (2008). Cambodian Buddhism: History and Practice. University of Hawaii Press. ISBN 978-0-8248-6176-6.
- Forest, Alain (1992). Le culte des génies protecteurs au Cambodge: analyse et traduction d'un corpus de textes sur les neak ta [The cult of protective geniuses in Cambodia: analysis and translation of a body of texts on neak ta] (in French). L'Harmattan. ISBN 978-2-7384-1317-8.
- Kent, Alexandra; Chandler, David Porter (2008). People of Virtue: Reconfiguring Religion, Power and Moral Order in Cambodia Today. NIAS Press. ISBN 978-87-7694-037-9.
