= Preah Khan Reach =

Khmer royal sacred sword

Preah Khan Reach (Khmer: ព្រះខ័នរាជ្យ) – the Khmer Royal Sacred Sword – is a double-edge straight sword, with a chiseled steel blade sheathed in a jeweled gold scabbard. Though it has disappeared since 1970, it was considered the symbol of Khmer sovereignty and legitimacy to the throne for whoever possessed it.

== Etymology ==
While Preah and Reach respectively refer to the divine and royal character of the sword, the Khmer word Khan comes from the similar sword in the Indian subcontinent called khanda which has its origins in the Sanskrit khaḍga (खड्ग) or khaṅga, from a root khaṇḍ meaning "to break, divide, cut, destroy".

== Legend ==
The Preah Khan Reach is both a historical and legendary sword, which at a certain point, was considered to be a living and magical object. In the 19th century, King Norodom of Cambodia believed that the sword had been made by Vishvakarma. According to another belief, the sword was made by the gods Shiva and Vishnu at the request of another god, Indra which explains why the sword represents the trimurti, Shiva circled by Indra and Vishnu: together, the blade, handle and the sheath form a tryptic reminiscent of the yoni-lingam structure.

== History ==
The furthest historical reference that one can find about Preah Khan Reach dates back to the reign of Jayavarman II (~802-850 A.D.). Jayavarman II left a Royal Sacred Sword – Preah Khan Reach – and a palladium as a royal heritage to his son Jayavardhana who reigned from 850 to 877 A.D. under the name Jayavarman III. Whether this sword is the same as the one that one present in the Royal Palace of Phnom Penh until 1970 is a matter of discussion, but according to some eye-witnesses of the 1960s, its appearance gives small hint of such antiquity.

While some have questioned whether the complex of temples of Preah Khan which bears the same name had been built under the reign of Jayavarman VII to host the royal sword, it is certain that the Preah Khan Reach was an object of veneration all through the history of the Khmer Empire.

The Preah Khan Reach was the sign of legitimacy of the ruling monarch. Thus, though Indravarman III (1295-1307 A.D.), who succeeded Jayavarman VIII (1243-1295 A.D.), was not of royal blood, his claim to the throne was accepted when the king's daughter, who was his lover, stole the Preah Khan Reach and handed it to him.

Though he had been crowned with the support of the Thai monarchy in 1806, by 1811, Ang Chan II changed sides and sought asylum, most certainly with his royal regalia, in Saigon in 1811. After his death in 1835, Cambodia was in great turmoil because the king did not have any male heir to the throne. He had only four daughters, namely Princesses Ang Pen, Ang Mei, Ang Peou, and Ang Snguon. During the reign of King Ang Chan, the Vietnamese had already occupied Cambodia and the two princes, Ang Em and Ang Duong were retained by Siam. The Vietnamese imposed Ang Mey as the new Queen of Cambodia, she was enthroned in the Vietnamese tradition, without any of the Khmer protocol or regalia, as a "puppet princess".

After years of an inconclusive war between Vietnam and Siam, King Ang Duong who had ascended to the throne in 1841 was finally formally invested as co-monarch of Cambodia in Bangkok with the royal regalia brought from Cambodia with the agreement of both Siam and Vietnam, while a similar ceremony without the regalia was being held in Phnom Penh for Queen Ang Mei. While Etienne Aymonier pretends that King Ang Duong He had the Sacred Sword safely secured at Oudong under a special pavilion where it was watched over night and day by the baku., it seems that like the regalia was stored in Bangkok for ten more years, safe from Vietnamese pillage. Ang Duong also sent his son, future king Norodom of Cambodia, to study in Bangkok, in 1850, as close as possible to the regalia.

In 1860, when King Ang Duong died, Norodom became his successor but remained uncrowned because the Siamese royal court refused to release the Cambodian royal regalia. King Norodom fled to Bangkok running away from an uprising of the Cham minority in province of Kompong Cham. Having not been properly consecrated yet, he sought help from France to recover the Preah Khan Reach so he could effectively do so. The Thai king declared that he would come to Cambodia himself to crown Norodom, but French Admiral La Grandière refused to allow it. Finally under French pressure, the Thai king agreed to solemnly return the Preah Khan Reach that Thailand had taken from Cambodia in August 1861. Norodom was officially crowned king of Cambodia on June 3, 1864, with all the royal regalia present.

On March 18, 1970, when Queen Kossamak heard that her son Sihanouk had been deposed by a coup d'état, she pulled the Preah Khan Reach from its scabbard and discovered that the blade was not gleaming but was a tarnished blackish color—a very bad omen. The regalia disappeared from the Royal Palace in Phnom Penh after the coup of March 18, 1970 led by General Lon Nol, and have not been seen again.

== Function ==
The Preah Khan Reach was the principal item of the royal regalia of Cambodia, along with five other royal artefacts; namely, the royal crown (preah mokod), the royal seven-tired pavilion (preah svetchot), the victory spear (preah lompeng chey) supposed to have been owned by the gardener-regicide Ta Trasak Pha’em, a legendary ruler of the late Angkorian period, and a dagger (kris) given to the Muslim king of Cambodia, by a Malay princess.

Piat was told by court Brahmins that the Preah Khan Reach was one of four sacred swords associated with “vassals that protect the kingdom at the four cardinal points” — a possible reference to the Four Heavenly Kings (Chaturmahārājikādeva) of the Buddhist tradition.

According to Khmer tradition, the person who both owned the Royal Sacred Sword (Preah Khan Reach) and the August Spear of Victory (Preah Lompèng Chey) is the true heir of the Khmer Kingdom. However, this sign is not sufficient, as it the crowned king must also be a descendant of a king not going beyond the fifth generation, nor is it sufficient in modern-day Cambodia, as the Constitution is interpreted as the new sign of the alliance between the King of Cambodia and his people and the safeguard of the country.

The most important but not exclusive role of the Royal Sword is for the crowning of a new king of Cambodia on his ascension to the throne, which can be compared to the role of La Joyeuse in the Kingdom of France or the Sword of Mercy in the United Kingdom. During the coronation ceremony the king is handed the sword by a Brahmin baku, then straps it onto his belt himself.

== Characteristics ==
Dating from the 13th century, the earliest description of the Preah Khan Reach is provided by Chinese envoy Zhou Daguan in his book The Customs of Cambodia after the ascension to the throne of Indravarman III describing it as a "golden sword".

Intricate Khmer carving could be seen on the handle and sheath. Its blade is made of cast steel and it is enhanced on the upper half of both sides by gold and silver damascene reliefs. At the top of the blade, a garuda flanked with nagas, a mask of Rahu, and Rama and Vishnu between more nagas.The handle is made of chiseled gold with repoussé and chasing and enhanced with colored enamels. The scabbard is in embossed gold on a fabric background and divided into six sections with finely executed deities.

The length of the blade is said to be a cubit and a great span, or approximately 72 centimeters.

The guard of Preah Khan Reach was entrusted to the Chief Brahman of the Royal Place, a baku known as Preah Esey-Phat. It was the job of the Chief Brahman to keep Preah Khan Reach safe and also to examine its blade from time to time. If the blade gave out a rusting color, then it would foretell a bad omen. The baku were to protect the supposed magical powers of the royal swords through various rites and incantations: if drawn from its scabbard without the prescribed ritual, it would bring disaster upon the country.

== Cultural influence ==
According to Ian Harris, a western scholar on Cambodian Buddhism, King Rama I of Thailand had a copy of the sword made for his own coronation in 1785.

To this day, the Preah Khan Reach is an object of pride and fascination for the Khmer people.

Cambodian dancer Chey Chankethya from the Secondary School of Fine Arts of Phnom Penh created a Khmer ballet in 2006 based on the legend of the Preah Khan Reach.

The Preah Khan reach also gave its name to the Preah Khan Reach Svay Rieng Football Club, which competes in the C-League, the top tier of Cambodian football.

== Bibliography ==
- S.-E. Thiounn, ministre du Palais Royal, des Finances et des Beaux-Arts du Cambodge, « Prah Khan, (l’épée sacrée du Cambodge) », Arts et archéologie khmers, Augustin Challamel, Paris, tome 1, 1921–1923, fascicule 1, pp. 59–63.
- Siyoun Sophearith, « ព្រះខ័នរាជ្ស (Preah Khan Reach) », Yosothor Cultural Dictionary, Renaissance culturelle Khmère.
