= Ang Chan I =

King of Cambodia (1516–1566)

Chan Reachea the Great ចន្ទរាជា
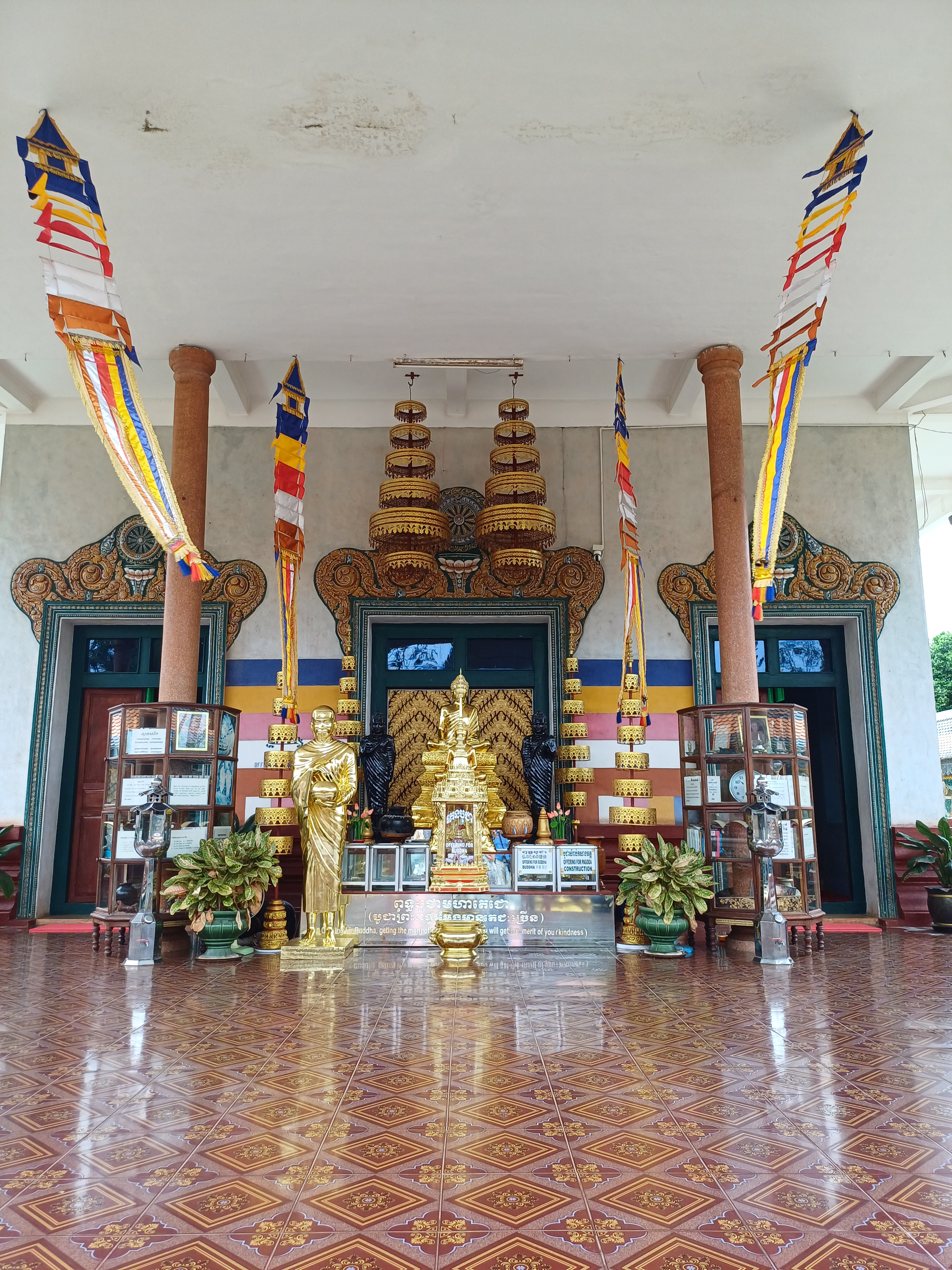
- Buddha Statue in Siem Reap, Cambodia.

King of Cambodia
- Reign: 1516–1566
- Coronation: 1516 (first); 1553 (second)
- Predecessor: Srei Chedtha
- Successor: Barom Reachea I
- Born: 1486; Chaktomuk, Cambodia
- Died: 1566 (aged 80); Longvek, Cambodia
- Burial: 1567; Phnom Santuk
- Spouse: Botum Bopha
- Issue: Prince Reameathiptei; Prince Barom Reachea I Princess Moha Tevi
- House: Varman Dynasty
- Father: Thommoreachea I
- Mother: Tep Bopha
- Religion: Buddhism

Ang Chan I
- Military career
- Conflicts: See battles: Cambodian Civil War; Battle of Toul Basan; Battle of Kampong Chhnang; Battle of Chaktomuk; Battle of the Four Rivers; Battle of Kampong Cham; Battles of the Conclusion; Battle at Tonle Bet; Battle of Sralop Pichey; First Cambodian-Siamese War (1530-1531); Battle of Siemreap; Second Cambodian-Siamese War (1549); Battle of Pursat; Battle of Battambang

Ang Chan I, also known as Chan Reachea the Great and Chao Ponhea Chan Reachea (Khmer: ចន្ទរាជា, romanized: Chăn Riachia, Thai: พญาจันทน์, Candarājā; 1486–1566) was a Cambodian king who reigned from 1516 to 1566. In his early years he was viceroy of the region of Phnom Penh and the eastern provinces, but was ousted by a pretender named Sdach Korn in 1512 and fled to Siam. He returned with a Siamese army in 1516 and was crowned king of Western Cambodia at Pursat after putting down several rebellions. A civil war with Korn ensued, leading to a number of battles involving firearms and cannons until Chan was finally victorious and crowned the king of all Cambodia.

Later, after the neighbouring Siamese invaded Cambodia twice, Chan regained the city of Longvek from the Siamese and built his new capital there, reigning peacefully until his death in 1566.

== Birth and early life ==
Chan Reachea ("Chan" henceforth), was born in Chaktomuk, Cambodia (modern-day Pnomh Penh) in 1486. He was the second son of King Dharma Rechea II and the half-brother of King Srei Sokuntbot ("Sokuntbot" henceforth), who reigned from Tuol Basan in Kampong Cham Province. Chan became the governor of Chaktomuk district at the age of 24, but in 1509 he was forcibly deported to the Cambodian-Siamese border at the request of Sokuntbot, who had dreamed of a threat to his throne in the form of two dragons flying to bite his royal umbrella, interpreting the dragons to be Chan and a rival Cambodian king Sdach Korn ("Korn" henceforth).

In 1512 Korn raised an army to conquer Tuol Basan and was victorious, expelling Sokuntbot from the capital and forcing the defeated king to set up a fort in the Stung Sen district of Kampong Thom province. Sokuntbot sent a message to Chan telling of Korn's revolt and appointing him as Grand Viceroy, tasked with returning to help him. Borrowing 5,000 Siamese troops from the Siamese king in return for 100 elephants, Chan arrived in Battambang province, where the district chief Ponhea Nou donated a further 10,000 troops and 100 food carts.

Chan continued his journey to Pursat province and met with the district chief, Mern Pich, who had 40,000 troops in Banteay Mernchey province. But Chan's travels and his preparation of a military strategy to help Sokuntbot had taken two years. Seeing how far Chan's military preparations were running behind, Korn attacked Sokuntbot's Stung Sen Fortress in 1514 with his navy and artillery and assassinated Sokuntbot. However the five Cambodian royal crowns disappeared at the same time as Sokuntbot's death, so Korn's official ascension was postponed for two years to wait for new crowns to be made. Korn finally declared his throne officially in 1516, naming it Srei Chetha Thiraj Reamea Thipadei.

== The Cambodian Civil War (1516–1525) ==
Cambodian Civil War (1516-1525)
Date	1516-1525
Location	Cambodia
Result	Ang Chan I victory

Commanders and leaders
Sdach Korn (executed); Ponhea Kamheng †; Duke Ben †; Ponhea lumpaing †	Ang Chan I Chakrei Keo; Vongsa Akka Reach; Ponhea Pheakdey; Ponhea Tep; Ponhea Doun keo Ponhea Keo; Ponhea Mern Pich †

Strength
400,000 troops	500,000 troops

Casualties and losses
Unknown	Unknown

With Chan now King of the Western Empire and Korn now King of the Eastern Empire, the stage was set for the two dragons of Sokuntbot's dream to compete for influence in the series of battles that became known as the Cambodian Civil War, beginning with the two kings dividing the Mekong River into two parts between them.

=== Battle of Tuol Basan (1517) ===
In 1516, three months after Korn ascended his throne in Tuol Basan, Chan raised 30,000 troops and besieged Korn, forcing him and his army to flee to the east and set up a new fort in the Tbong Khmum district between Kampong Cham and Prey Veng provinces. Kong established a new capital there called Sralop Dountei Pichey Prey Nokor, building a fortress 7.5 meters high and with a total length of 2.5 kilometers. With this fortress established, a year later in 1517 Korn returned to Chan's capital of Tuol Basan and set fire to it, forcing Chan and his army to withdraw to Banteay Mernchey. The two kings then opened peace talks to allow time to gather food and increase their armies, thereby suspending the war for three years until 1520.

=== Battle of Kampong Chhnang (1520) ===
At the end of the three year peace from 1517 to 1520, Korn mobilized 120,000 troops and formed some of them into two divisions. The first division of 20,000 troops was led by Chao Ponhea Lumpaing and tasked with setting up strongholds in Samrong Tong district (now Kampong Speu province), while the second division of 30,000 troops was led by Ponhea Kao and was to make a fortress in Chey Sour village (now Wat Vihear Sour, Kandal province). With an army of 20,000 troops led by General Chao Ponhea Lumpaing, Korn left Samrong Tong to launch a pre-attack on Chan in Kampong Chhnang Province. But Chan led 20,000 of his own troops to confront them, fighting fiercely with arrows, swords, spears, and artillery in what became the Battle of Kampong Chhnang. Chan was bolstered by a further 10,000 troops and 140 warrior elephants who were hiding in the forest behind the army of Chao Ponhea Lumpeang and who now rushed out to attack Korn's army. Korn was defeated and fled to Chaktomuk, where he built a fort.

=== Battle of Chaktomuk (1521) ===
In 1521, one year after the battle of Kampong Chhnang, Chan ordered two of his commanders – Oknha Chakrei Keo and Oknha Vongsa Akka Reach – to lead 30,000 troops in an attack on Korn's new Chaktomuk fortress, now guarded by a 10,000-strong army led by General Chao Ponhea Lumpaing. But with Chan's army being much larger than Korn's army, they prevailed on the Chaktomuk battlefield. Chan's army then marched on Bati district (now Takeo province), with Chan later announcing that all district governors in the Kampuchea Krom area must keep their troops neutral, or otherwise he would fight them to the death.

=== Battle on the Four Rivers (1522) ===
After Korn discovered that his nephew Chao Ponhea Lumpaing had been killed in Chaktomuk fortress by Chan's army he became very angry and ordered his general Ponhea Kao, stationed in Chey Sour village in Kandal province, to mobilize for immediate revenge. So in 1522, 30,000 of Ponhea Kao's troops crossed the river to the west. The first 15,000 were infantry, stationed at Boeung Pong Peay, north of Phnom Penh, and led by Ponhea Sral and Javea Viang, while Ponhea Kao himself led the second battalion of 15,000 troops and 60 warships who stormed Chan's port at Chroy Ponlea (now Chroy Changvar).

Ponhea Kao's navy was so strong that it chased Chan's navy, led by Vibol Reach and Protous Reach, to Prek Pnov, But then Chan's General Ponhea Mern Pich came out of the fort he had set up in Prek Taten to reinforce the Vibol Reach and Prothous Reach troops. Seeing this, Ponhea Kao used the trick of pretending to lose and retreat so that Ponhea Mern Pich would chase after him and his army, allowing Ponhea Sral and Javea Viang who were north of Phnom Penh to attack Ponhea Mern Pich's troops from behind. In the end, Ponhea Mern Pich was killed in the Chatomuk river, which was called "the bloody river" by the locals. The place is now known as the Ponhea Mern Pich Monastery or Ta Pich, and is next to the Royal Monument in front of the Cambodia Royal Palace.

=== Battle of Kampong Cham (1523) ===
After winning the river battle but with his surviving 10,000 troops tired and having gone without food for many days, Ponhea Kao decided to set up camp in the Kampong Siem district of Kampong Cham province. On the other side of the conflict, Chan was shocked and saddened after receiving the news of the death of Ponhea Mern Pich, and appointed Oknha Khleang Moeung as the new Chief of Army Staff as he was well known for his war tactics and military leadership. In 1523, Chan divided his army into two divisions, with the first division of 55,000 led by himself setting out on the battleship Saray Andet and accompanied by 300 other warships to gather troops in the province of Santuk (now Kampong Thom province). The second group of 50,000 troops was led by Oknha Khleang Moeung and went out at the same time to attack Ponhea Kao's army in the Kampong Siem district of Kampong Cham province.

The news of Chan's declaration of war reached Korn and he mobilized his remaining 80,000 troops into five divisions: the first division of 15,000 troops was the front line army, led by Ponhea Prom Vieng; the second division of 10,000 troops was led by Ponhea Penh; the third division of 10,000 troops was led by Ponhea Nuon; the fourth division consisted of 10,000 troops and was the rear line army; and the fifth division, led by Ponhea Phat Sral and Ponhea Vibol Reach, had 20,000 troops and 300 warships to defend the fort in Kampong Siem district, the site of the battle of Kampong Cham. Korn directly commanded 20,000 royal troops and assigned 20,000 more under Generals Ponhea Kao and Javea Viang. Including the 40,000 troops guarding the Sralop Pichey fort in Tbong Khmum district (now Tbong Khmum province), the total number of troops defending Korn's Kampong Siem district was 65,000.

Eventually, more than 100,000 of Chan's troops attacked the fort of Kampong Cham, resulting in Chan and Korn waging a great war on this battlefield in Kampong Siem district. Both armies damaged a lot of military equipment, and so the two kings sent envoys to purchase cannons from the Portuguese in Malacca on the Malay Peninsula, as recorded by historians in the 16th century. Chan ordered 100 artillery pieces and 1,000 pistols to be kept in the fort, while Korn ordered 150 artillery pieces and 2,000 rifles. But a boat carrying this materiel to Korn was intercepted in the Peam district of Kampuchea Krom and instead sent to Chan, leaving Korn with no weapons with which to re-supply his army.

=== Battle of Tonle Bet (1524) ===
In 1524, Chan raised 135,000 troops divided into four divisions. The first division of 50,000 troops was led by Ponhea Pheakdey and was tasked with intercepting the 40,000-strong army of Ponhea Komheng, the father-in-law of Korn, which was stationed in Siem Poi district (now Siem Pang district, Stung Treng province), so that it could not be brought to help Korn. The second division of 40,000 troops was led by Ponhea Tep and tasked with attacking the road to Sralop Pichey in what became the Battle of Tonle Bet, while the third division of 40,000 auxiliary troops was led by Chan Reachea and stationed in Kampong Siem district. The fourth division of 5,000 troops led by Oknha Maha Montrei went to hide in Prey Veng province.

Eventually, 40,000 of Ponhea Tep's troops encountered 20,000 of Korn's troops who were stationed on the closed river, and the two armies fought from morning until afternoon. The news of the battle at Tonle Bet reached Ponhea Kao who was guarding Sralop Pichey fortress. He left urgently to help Korn, leaving Javea Viang Chum with 10,000 troops to defend Sralop Pichey. Ponhea Kao's army arrived in time to liberate Korn, with Ponhea Tep's army blocking the back road next to Korn and Ponhea Kao attacking and encountering an ambush of 5,000 troops of Oknha Maha Montrei Ben's troops as he advanced to Prey Veng province. Seeing this, Ponhea Kao told Korn to go to Sralop Picheay fortress. But while Korn and Duke Ben were waiting to defend themselves, Ponhea Kao threw his spear at Duke Ben, killing him. Korn managed to return to Sralop Pichey fortress, but the army of his father-in-law Ponhea Kamheng was "beaten to death" by Ponhea Pheakdey.

=== Chan's final victory at Sralop Pichey (1525) ===
In 1525, Chan raised 140,000 troops to attack the Sralop Pichey fortress of Korn, which was guarded by only 40,000 troops. In what was known as the battle of Tbong Khmum district, Chan's army besieged Sralop Pichey for 15 days as the fort was too high and difficult to attack directly. But a few days later, Korn was beheaded by his brother-in-law, Doun Keo Officer, and together with Ponhea Kao, he presented Chan with victory. As promised, Chan promoted Doun Keo Officer to Ponhea Doun Keo and made him the Governor of Tbong Khmum District. The heads of Korn and the leaders of his 25 factions were displayed in front of the fortress of Sralop Picheay. Chan had won the civil war.

== First Cambodian-Siamese War (1530–1531) ==
Cambodian-Siamese war (1530-1531)
- Part of Siamese–Cambodian Wars
Date	1530-1531
Location	Cambodia, Siem Reap
Result	Cambodian defensive victory; Siamese invasion repelled

Belligerents
Ayutthaya Kingdom	Kingdom of Cambodia

Commanders and leaders
Maha Chakkraphat; Ponhea Ong Domhat (executed)	Ang Chan I

Units involved
Siamese Army	Cambodian Army; Longvek army forces

Strength
50,000 troops	70,000 troops

Casualties and losses
10,000 captured and taken to Cambodia	Unknown

in 1530, the new Siamese King Maha Chakkraphat sent three envoys to ask for an offering from the Cambodian King Chan. Chan replied that the Kingdom of Cambodia was no longer under the control of the Kingdom of Siam, particularly as the King of Siam was not willing to come and test Cambodia's strength.

=== Battle of Angkor City (1530) ===
A year after Cambodia did not send tribute to the Siamese kingdom, the Siamese king raised 50,000 troops from Nakhon Ratchasima through to the provincial border at Mahanokor (now Siem Reap Province), and put them under Siamese army chief Ponhea Ong Damkhat, the son of the Khmer king Srei Reachea and also a cousin of Chan. In reply, Chan raised an army of 70,000 troops to invade Cambodia, composed of 50,000 Longvek troops plus 20,000 troops from Mahanokor. These 70,000 fought fiercely against the Siamese army at the Battle of Stung Angkor, and the Siamese army was humiliated, with the Siamese commander Ponhea Ong Domhat dying and his sword horn dropping from his elephant's back. The battle was a great victory for Chan, who captured more than 10,000 Siamese soldiers. Chan then changed the name of Mahanokor province to Siem Reap province, literally meaning "Siam defeated", the name it still bears to this day.

== Second Cambodian-Siamese War (1549) ==
Cambodian-Siamese war (1549)
- Part of Siamese–Cambodian Wars
Date	1549
Location	Northern Cambodia, Kampot
Result	Cambodian victory; Siamese invasion Seconds time repelled

Belligerents
Ayutthaya Kingdom	Longvek

Commanders and leaders
Maha Chakkraphat; Ponhea Veang San; Ponhea Srey Sorst (executed); Preah Ream Rakha (executed)	Ang Chan I Khleang Moeung † ‡‡ (allegedly)

Units involved
Royal Siamese Army; Siamese forces; (Portugal) Portuguese mercenaries	Cambodian Army; Longvek army forces; Khleang Moeung's Ghost Army

Strength
140,000-560,000 troops	260,000 troops 500 elephants

Casualties and losses
90,000 Killed (Some claim 360,000-460,000 Killed); 10,000 Captured	20,000 Killed (Were kiiled in the battle of pursat)

In 1555, Siam raised 140,000 troops to invade Cambodia for the second time. The Siamese army was divided into two divisions, with the first division of 90,000 troops, led by the Siamese King Chakkraphat, attacking Battambang province and invading Pursat province. The second division of 50,000 troops was led by Ponhea Veang San and invaded Kampot province.

=== Battle of Pursat ===
Chan learnt of these attacks and ordered 60,000 of Duke Kralahom Keo Gather's troops in Bassac, Preah Trapeang, Kramuon Sar, Bati, and Banteay Meas provinces to confront the Siamese army in Kampot province, while Khleang Moeung led 40,000 Cambodian troops to fight the Siamese army invading Pursat. However, after several hours it was clear that the Siamese army and armaments were much larger than those of Khleang Moeung, and so the duke decided to withdraw his army back to the fort, losing about 20,000 troops in the process. As a result, there were only 20,000 of his troops left to defend the fort, starving and besieged by Siamese troops. Chan's auxiliaries arrived in Pursat two days later, but when General Khleang Moeung looked at his traumatised army he realised that the Siamese could win and capture the Pursat area, thereby threatening the Longvek Kingdom. He needed to outwit the Siamese army.

General Moeung devised a plan to disguise 4,000 of the men in his barracks as straw men, and hide them in the forest near the Siamese camp. Dressed in all white, he led his family in praying to eight Deva, offering rice and perfume and pretending that he and his family would jump to their deaths in another seven hours in order to mobilize the ghost army. But in the meantime, the rest of his troops should attack the Siamese. Consequently, the Siamese army had to raise their army to fight in the afternoon but waited until dusk to bring their army back to surround what they thought was Moeung's ghost army. But there were no Cambodian troops, only straw men disguised as soldiers. Fighting from dusk to midnight, the 4,000 Cambodians actually hidden in the forest set fire to the Siamese army camp, burning it in front of and behind the retreating Siamese army.

=== Battle of Battambang ===
The Siamese leadership announced that all the remaining Cambodian troops would be killed by the Siamese army at O'Svay Doun Keo in Battambang province. The Siamese army encamped there two days later after 200,000 Cambodian troops, including 500 elephants and 5,000 war horses led by Chan himself arrived in Pursat province to prepare for the battle to oust the Siamese army. Chan's forces attacked the Siamese army in what became known as the Battle of Battambang, stabbing the Siamese general Chao Pe'an to death on the back of an elephant and thereby defeating the Siamese army. The Cambodian Longvek army went on to

== Later years ==
Siam had been at war with Burma from 1547, and so, seizing the opportunity, the Cambodian army under Chan launched a counter-offensive and Angkor was regained from the Siamese. In 1553, he was crowned again in Longvek. During the period of 1559–1564, Chan's army led a number of border raids on the nearby regions of Ayuttaya.

Portuguese missionary Gaspar da Cruz visited Longvek in 1556 during Chan's reign and preached the gospel. But he left the country the next year, disappointed that most Cambodians were devout Buddhists and refused to convert to Roman Catholicism.

== See also ==
- Sdach Korn
- Longvek
- Burmese-Siamese War (1547-1549)

Ang Chan I Varman Dynasty Born: 1476 Died: 1566
Regnal titles
Preceded by Sdach Korn	King of Cambodia; 1516–1566	Succeeded by Barom Reachea I
