= Adhémard Leclère =

French diplomat, economist, politician (1853–1917)

- Born: 12 May 1853; Alençon
- Died: March 16, 1917 (aged 63); Alençon
- Occupations: Colonial official, economist, politician, and ethnologist

Adhémard Leclère (12 May 1853 – 16 March 1917) was a French colonial official, economist, politician, and ethnologist.

== Biography ==
Born into the French anticlerical and republican tradition, Leclère became interested in socialism at an early age, and was involved in the foundation of the labour journal The Proletarian, of which he became editor-in-chief. A typographer, he founded Typographie Francaise (the official journal of the union of French workers), and collaborated with La Justice, La Revue Scientifique, La Deutsche Revue, and other foreign reviews.

In May 1886, Leclère was nominated a Résident (governor) in the French protectorate of Cambodia, first in Kampot (until 1890), then Kratie-Sambor (1890-1894), Kratie, and finally Phnom Penh, where he served as résident-maire from 1899 to 1903. In 1908, Leclère was named inspector and advisor to the Résident Supérieure (the chief advisor to the Cambodian government), a position which he occupied until 1911.

As founder and vice-president of the Ethnological Society of Paris, Leclère was responsible for numerous works on the language, customs, law, religion, and culture of Cambodia.
