= Maspero =

People with the name Maspero include:

- François Maspero (1932–2015), French author and journalist
- Gaston Maspero (1846–1916), French Egyptologist
- Georges Maspero (1872–1942), French sinologist, son of Gaston
- Henri Maspero (1882–1945), French sinologist, son of Gaston
- Jean Maspero (1885–1915), French papyrologist, son of Gaston
- Riccardo Maspero (born 1970), Italian footballer

== Other uses ==
- Maspero television building, Cairo, Egypt
- Maspero demonstrations, demonstrations by Egyptian Copts in 2011
- Éditions Maspero, Paris publishing house founded by François Maspero
