= Khmer nobility =

The Khmer nobility is a social class comprising titled officials in the service of the monarchy. They form part of a hierarchical social system which developed from the time of the Angkorian Empire. While all titles were abolished by Pol Pot under the Democratic Kampuchea, they were restored and have multiplied since the restoration of monarchy in 1990 by late King Father Norodom Sihanouk.

Khmer noble titles comprise a rank and a title, which denote the holder's post or office. Unlike in European aristocracies, Khmer noble titles are not inherited, but individually granted based on personal merit. Nevertheless, familial influence is substantial and dynasties can be identified such as the Thiounn family which served the Royal Palace for decades.

== Identity of the Khmer nobility ==
=== A leadership of virtue: neak mean bon ===
The Khmer people see the Montrey as a Neak Mean Bon (one who received a heavenly mandate). Say Bory in his thesis on Rural administration of Cambodia and its reform projects in 1974 describes this conception as an "event-driven conception" since it determines the origin of power by an unusual event almost inexplicable by pure reason.

=== A leadership in alliance: titles dependent on an absolute faithfulness to the King ===
In the laws of Manu, the constitution of a body of Montrey to his devotion is considered one of the duties of the king. Duty implies mutual respect. Indeed, the Khmer kings saw the Montreys in their misfortune as sure allies and in happiness as effective servants.

=== A leadership in language: the royal vocabulary ===
Social class in Cambodia is identified by a specific vocabulary which constitutes as "categorical nobility". For the King and the nobility attached to the highest offices of the monarchy, this specific vocabulary known as royal vocabulary known as Kbuon Reach Sap (ក្បួនរាជសព្ទ) is still in use, after the Khmer Rouge attempted to suppress it in vain. The reference book on royal vocabulary was published in 1941 in Phnom Penh and it still remains in use to this day.

== History ==
=== Angkorian Empire: Indian origin of the Montrey and Chinese influence ===
In ancient China, the path to the title of Mandarin was democratic and based on Confucian morality. All scholars (educated Chinese) wishing to access the title of Mandarin could participate in the competition, which was organized at the national level by the imperial house. As for the Montrey title, the access route was provided by family ties.

The Khmer monarchy needed, like all ancient monarchies in the world, an organization with a hierarchical system allowing it to apply the orders: Samdech, Okgna, Chao Poňéa, Préas Luong, Luong, Khun, Moeun, Néay . According to Khin Sok, the Samdech and the Okhna are considered as Moha Montrey, the others are only middle and junior officials.

Noble families were tasked with keeping the Royal Chronicles of Cambodia as can be read from the Khmer inscription K. 380 found on the southern gopura of Preah Vihear. The latter refers to the "families which keep the chronicles of the Kambu family, with the glory of the earthly sovereigns untul Suryavarman I".

=== Oudong era: the Thai substitution ===
After the fall of Angkor in 1431, the Siamese recorded their earliest extensive descriptions of its own nobility inspired by the Khmer nobility in the administrative reforms introduced in 1448 by King Borommatrailokanat of Ayutthaya, which by then had become the dominant polity in the region, substituting the influence of the Angkorian empire.

=== Chaktomuk era: limited French influence ===
The most lasting influence of the French protectorate on the Cambodian nobility was mostly due to the Orientalists, who, in their overwhelming majority, persist in arguing that Khmer nobility does not exist, in as much as it does not match the Western understanding of nobility as understands in terms of lineage and stability. Thus, French navy officer Albert Bouinais famously stated, "there is no hereditary nobility in Cambodia, lest we assimilate the preah or the brahmin to any such nobility".

As the French authorities supported the extension of the Kingdom of Cambodia and the return of the Western provinces of Cambodia around Siem Reap and Battambang, it faced the opposition of the Thai nobility and in particular the House of Abhaiwongse which governed the parts of Cambodia. This aninomisty lasted until the last Franco-Thai War and even beyond Cambodian Independence, as the House of Abhaiwongse gave its support to the Khmer Issarak and later even the Khmer Rouge in an attempt to reclaim its lost territories.

=== Contemporary nobility: the revival of the Oknha ===
Since the restoration of the Kingdom of Cambodia in the 1990s, royal titles have been given once again. While many members of the Khmer nobility where decimated under the Khmer Rouge terror, or forced into exile, many such as a King Norodom Sihanouk or Queen Monique returned to their homeland.

Among the many titles, the title of Oknha has known a particular revival as the awarding of this title has enable Cambodia to restore an elite class in its kingdom, while some have been critical of a certain form of ploutarchy as titles were being sold.

== Titles ==
=== Samdech ===
Samdech is a Cambodian honorific bestowed by the King of Cambodia to individuals deemed to have made significant contributions to the nation.

=== Montrey ===
The word Montrey has several meanings in Cambodian: an intellectual or one who has knowledge or one who runs a state affair or one who has honor or one who has simply distinguished himself from the Reastr (man of the people) by his title of dignity. A Montrey is a state of mind or mentality. He belongs to an intrinsically different group from the Reastr. The Montreys form themselves into a closed social category based on power and practice endogamy within the group.

=== Oknha ===
Oknha (Khmer: ឧកញ៉ា, Ŏknha [ʔok.ɲaː]) is a Khmer honorific. It has different meanings depending on the period it was used.
