= Thiounn =

Minister of the Palace under the French protectorate of Cambodia

Somdach Veang Thiounn
- ឧកញ៉ា វ៉ាង ជួន
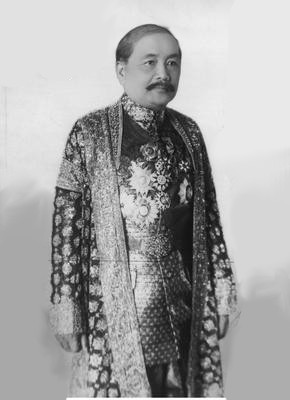
- Thiounn in the 1930s
- Born: April 8, 1864; Kampong Tralach, Kampong Chhnang, Cambodia
- Died: September 1946 (aged 82); Cambodia

Somdach Veang Thiounn (Khmer: ឧកញ៉ា វ៉ាង ជួន, romanized: Oknha Veang Thiounn, April 8, 1864–September 1946) was a Cambodian state official of the Khmer nobility during the French protectorate of Cambodia who had a lasting influence on Khmer historiography through the Cambodian Royal Chronicles. While he has been described as the shogun of the French protectorate and a "comprador feudalist", others have praised his long service to the Kingdom of Cambodia, as "the epitome of the colonial subject who quickly saw how to turn the new regime to an advantage":

== Early life and education ==
Thiounn was born in the Kampong Tralach district of Kampong Chhnang province on April 8, 1864, in a Vietnamese family of fishermen who had emigrated from Ha Tien and settled a few miles north of Longvek. His father was known as oknha piphéac norit Hui, a Cambodian merchant and "honorary mandarin" of the personal guard of Her Majesty the Queen Mother. probably Queen Pen, mother of King Norodom. His father Huy died in 1897 and his mother Veng shortly after him in 1900. As a child, Thiounn attended the Franco-Cambodian school in Phnom Penh, then joined classes at the Chasseloup-Laubat high school in Saigon.

== Civil career ==
Speaking not only Khmer and Siamese but also French, Thiounn was hired as secretary of the Council of Ministers in 1883. He served as a mediator between the French administration and King Norodom.

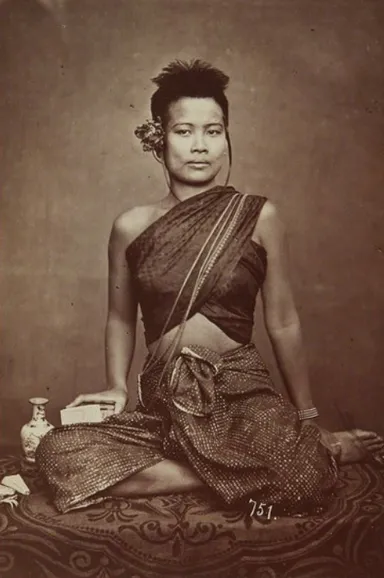
Khmer ballerina Neang Sok (nicknamed "Mi Soc"), mother of Thiounn's wife, Malis (1866).

In 1884, Thiounn married a certain Malis, daughter of mī Soc and Paul Le Faucheur, “runner of arroyos” with a sulphurous reputation with the Indochinese authorities.

Auguste Pavie invited the young Thiounn to Kingdom of France in 1885 when he was only nineteen years old. After spending three years in France, Thiounn was then appointed interpreter on February 1, 1888, to be attached to the Mission Pavie until 1895. Thiounn also helped Pavie translate many Khmer folktales such as Vorvong and Sorvong.

While he was harshly criticized by the more conservative dignitaries of the Royal Palace who supported rebel prince Si Votha, Veang Thiounn encouraged collaboration with the French protectorate for the modernization of Cambodia.

=== From political instability to exceptional longevity as Minister of the Palace ===
==== L'affaire Yukanthor ====
After the insurrection of 1884-1886 and later his failed diplomatic trip to France in 1886, Prince Norodom Yukanthor went after those he presumed where responsible for making Cambodia a "slave inside the whims of (French) administrators". Yukanthor demanded the removal of the Prime Minister Um "who ran away before the enemy" in 1885, and of Thiounn, secretary of the Council of Ministers, the latter two which Yukanthor accused of being the "two main embezzlers of the country".

In the scandal around Prince Yukanthor, Thiounn did not try to defend himself and sided with the French colonial authorities. Thiounn was accused by Yukanthor to be a half-breed treated as a puppet by the French since his recruitment as secretary-interpreter, placed by them in the council of ministers and accused of enriching himself there thanks to the spices he demands in return for his services. Thiounn is thus accused to have illegally amassed a real estate fortune. The decision of a man like Thiounn to position himself alongside the French is easily explained. He was not a man rooted in the royal administration. After serving the French for a long time, he probably had a good idea of the extent of their power.

==== Minister of the Palace on a royal journey to France ====
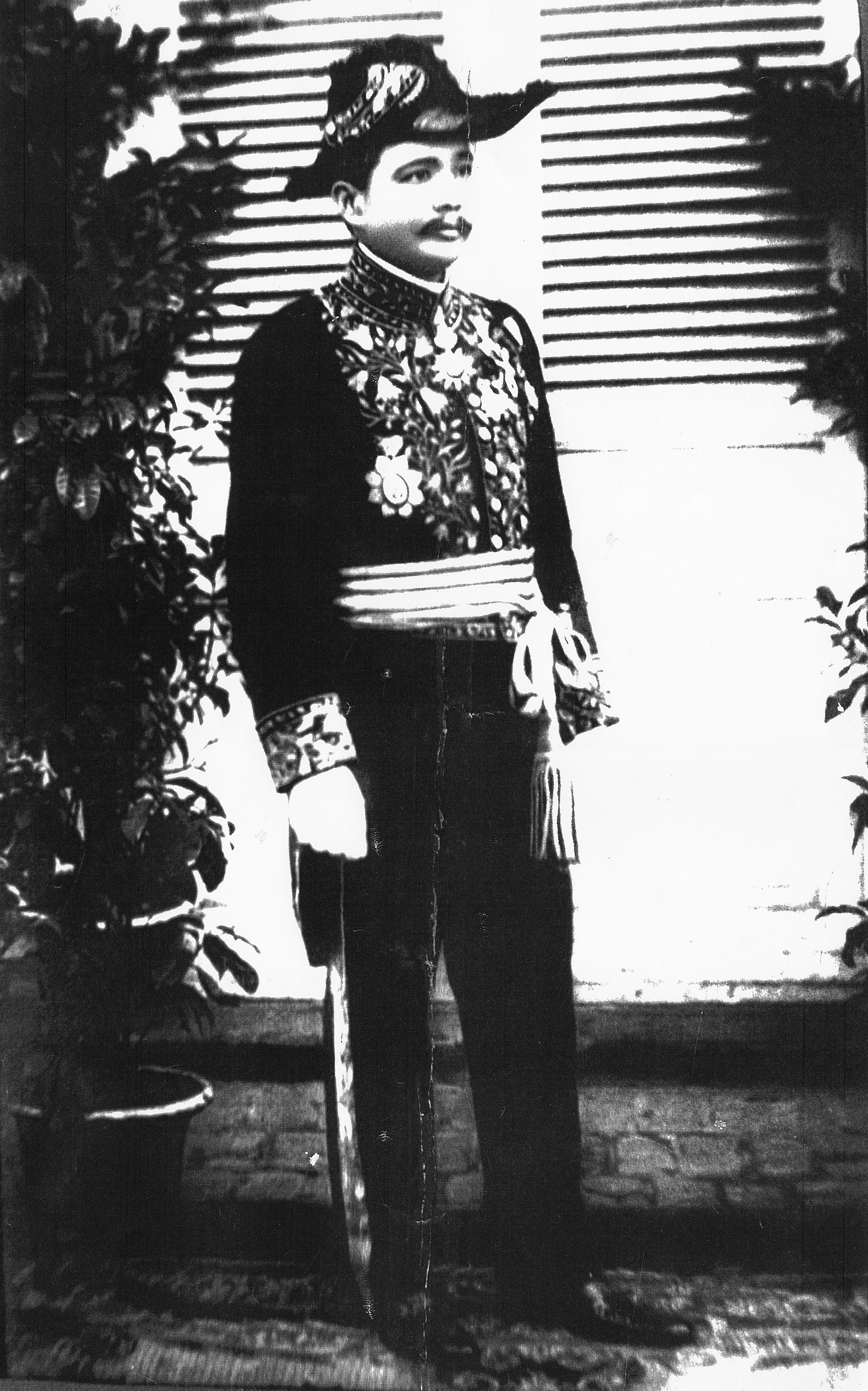
The young Thiounn, in full military uniform, as Minister of the Palace in 1910.

From 1892, he became, as Deputy Secretary of the Council of Ministers, one of the main mediators between the Cambodia monarchy and the Résident supérieur. From first secretary in 1897, he became general secretary and ex officio member of the council of ministers in 1899.

In 1902, Thiounn was placed with King Norodom I by Resident Superior Boulloche and appointed Minister of the Palace, Finances and Fine Arts. He kept that position until the end of the reign of King Sisowath in 1927 and even under King Monivong until 1941. In 1906, he accompanied King Sisowath to France in what was the first international tour of the Royal Ballet of Cambodia. The French public was impressed by their performance and French journal L'Illustration praised Thiounn for his bright intellect and love of France. His son Thiounn Hol also joined the royal journey, and received as sponsorship to study at the Ecole coloniale. Thiounn wrote the account of his trip, in which he punctiliously reports every stage of the long sea-voyage of the King.

Around 1915, Thiounn Yang, daughter of Thiounn, was married Poc Duch's son, Poc Hell, sealing strong matrimonial alliances with others dignitaries.

==== Promoter of the material and immaterial heritage of Cambodia ====
As early as 1914, Thiounn became the patron of an important Buddhist pagoda, Wat Kampong Tralach Krom, in the historical whereabouts of the lost capital of Longvek.

In 1917, Thiounn become involved in other major heritage projects such as the School of Arts, which eventually become the Royal University of Fine Arts, and the Albert Sarraut Museum, which become the National Museum of Cambodia. At that time, Thiounn also began working on what would we his major literary legacy, a revised and expanded edition of the Royal Chronicles of Cambodia. Thiounn worked a major bilingual illustrated history of the Reamker based on his previous work in the Silver Pagoda, but his work was never properly published.

Through his participation in such heritage publications, particularly in the review Kambuja Suriya in collaboration with Suzanne Karpelès, Thiounn appears as one of the first indigenous Khmer intellectuals or neak-cheh-doeung,representatives of local religious and cultural knowledge in tune with his time through the transmission of Khmer heritage in modern forms such as printed edition in French.

In 1928, following the coronation of Monivong, Thiounn was made president of the Permanent Committee of the Council of Ministers. By then, he had accumulated more wealth and power than anybody else in the Kingdom of Cambodia:

[Thiounn] is now the richest and most powerful man in the kingdom [...]. He is the real master; the other ministers, the crown prince, even [Sisowath] himself tremble before him, mut and resigned.

— [Harry A. Franck, East of Siam, 1926

After the demise of Son Diep in 1935, Thiounn promoted his son Thiounn Hol as secretary of the Council of Ministers. Also in the 1930s, Thiounn arranged the wedding of granddaughter Poc Vane with the candidate for the throne Sisowath Monireth (1909-1975), reproducing the marriage practices associating the families of dignitaries with the royal family, aggravating both King Monivong and the French authorities, who would later prefer another candidate to the throne, Norodom Sihanouk.

Thus, Thiounn was Prime Minister until the very beginning of his reign King Norodom Sihanouk, after having him under his tutelage for some years. Sihanouk said of Thiounn that by the end of his career, Thiounn was a "veritable little king" and "as powerful as the French Residents-Superieurs of the period". When the Second World War worsened the situation in Cambodia with the presence of the Japanese, Thiounn was deposed, at the request of the French admiral Jean Decoux under the orders of the Vichy government, and replaced by Ung Hy, who was younger and more obedient to the French authorities. In fact, this decision may have been encouraged by the young Sihanouk as well, as in 1967, the latter accused Thiounn of "dipping his finger in the palace treasury" so that he might commit the greater sin of raising his children "as princes".

Veang Thiounn died in September 1946.

== Legacy ==
Minister Thiounn was perhaps the outstanding example of the advancement of a “new man”, a protégé of the French who was without either the family or the official background to justify his advancement in terms of traditional Cambodia.

— Milton E. Osborne, The French Presence in Cochinchina and Cambodia: Rule and Response (1859-1905)

=== Reamker ===
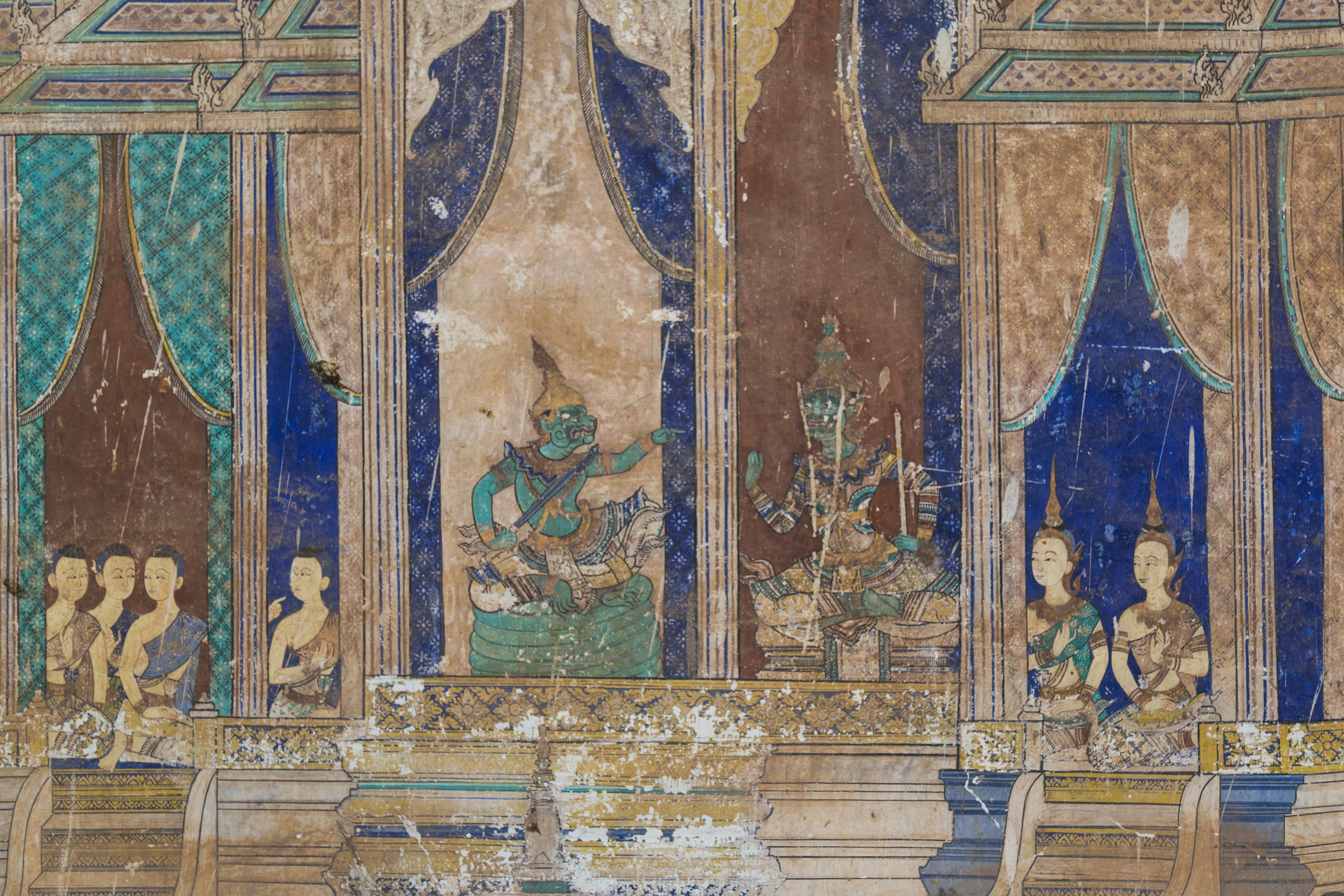
Thiounn extensively studied the murals depicting the Reamker in the Silver Pagoda, hoping to give a more concise and accessible narrative to both Khmer and French audiences.

In 1903, Oknha Veang Thiounn published a description of the wall paintings in the Royal Palace depicting the Reamker. Not only did he explain the scenes depicted in the paintings in the cloister of the Silver Pagoda. He also included in his introduction the prolegomena of the Râmayana in various Indian myths. Though he did substantial study of the original myths, he significantly altered in order to make the visit of the Royal Palace easier for visitors.

These commentaries were instrumental in transmitting this traditional epic, before the later translation made by Saveros Pou; his identification of scenes was picked up in various Buddhist monasteries as was the case in the Wat Bo monastery in Siem Reap.

=== International fame of the Royal Ballet of Cambodia ===
While Veang Thiounn had originally resisted sending the few remaining Royal dancers to France, he finally accepted under the insistence of Col de Monteiro, Minister of the Navy, who offered to arrange to travels by sea for all.

The detail report of his travel to France in 1903 is a rare document which relates in detail the first ever international tour of the Royal Ballet of Cambodia. It compares to the report of King Chulalongkorn, Loin de chez moi (Far from home) which tells the story of latter's first trip to the West in 1907. While the Khmer tour was immensely popular in France as could be seen from the impact it had on sculptor Auguste Rodin or on dramaturgist Jean Cocteau who wrote Sisowath en balade in 1906, Thiounn's account is the only one remaining from the Cambodian perspective. After this trip, struck by its international appeal, Veang Thiounn became an "ardent devotee of the Cambodian dance" and contributed to his renewal back home. However, according to Olivier de Bernon, this type of performance, such as the "empty choreography" prepared by Thiounn on Albert Sarrault's request for the colonial exhibitions, a type of performance aimed at strangers cleared the way, as time went on, for a gradual ‘modernization’ and cheapening of a sacred artistic genre.

Thiounn also established a historical discourse which associated court dance with the reign of King Jayavarman II, identified by French scholars as the founder of the Angkor era, but associated by Thiounn with the legendary figure of King Ketumala known from The Poem of Angkor Wat and Cambodian Royal Chronicles prior to the fifteenth century.

=== Cambodian Royal Chronicles ===
Okna Veang Thiounn rewrote the Royal Chronicles of Cambodia. He was able to creatively combine established traditional Khmer narratives with the developing critical history emerging from Khmer archeology, promoted by the French School of the Far East. The Royal Chronicle, known as the Veang Thiounn Chronicle, named after the minister who presided over its writing, was probably completed in 1934, and preserved in eight notebooks, notably at the Buddhist Institute of Phnom Penh.

When Thiounn made the effort to formulate his own narrative on the origins and other elements of Cambodian dance, he selectively ignored the details of what French scholarship had established about the rulers of Angkor, and adopted the narrative of the Khmer Chronicles.

— Theara Thun

Compared to previous Chronicles, Veang Thiounn adds much information, of which the source, hearsay or unknown documents, remains unclear. For instance, while Thai and Cambodian sources state the Vietnamese drowned in the Mekong river after her sisters had been taken to Saigon. Khin Sok, citing the Veang Thiounn version of the chronicles, states that Khmer Princess Baen was taken to Long ho and tortured to death by the Vietnamese general, after which her body was placed in a sack and thrown in the river, adding details of cruelty incriminating for the Vietnamese neighbours.

Eng Soth continued in that same tradition and add on even more unknown stories to the Cambodian Royal Chronicles in the second half of the 20th century, while Khin Sok appealed for a more historical criticism.

== Posterity ==
Veang Thiounn was the first notorious member of the Thiounn family to reach a position of power in Cambodia. His descendants, though highly educated and qualified, were excluded from the Palace after having been its masters; later, they were among the Cambodian intellectuals of French culture whose aspirations placed them in a situation of competition with the Crown. Just as the deposed Siamese Royal House of Abhaiwongse supported the Khmer Issarak in Battambang, four of Thiounn's grandchildren were cadres of the Khmer rouge: Thiounn Hol, Thiounn Thoeun, Thiounn Mumm, Thiounn Prasith. The grandfather of Douc Rasy was also the cousin of Samdech Chaufea Veang Thiounn.

== Works ==
- 1903 : Rioeun Kumnouv Reamker (Notice sur les fresques des galeries de la Pagode royale Preah Oubosoth Rottanaram).
- 1905: « Les fêtes anniversaires de la naissance de Sa Majesté le roi du Cambodge », Revue coloniale, décembre-janvier 1905–1906, pp. 410–417.
- 1906: Programme des fêtes du couronnement de S. M. Prea Bat Samdach Prea Sisowath. Paris.
- 1907: « Fête de la coupe de cheveux d’un ou de plusieurs jeunes princes ou princesses membres de la famille royale du Cambodge », La revue indochinoise n°52, février 1907, pp. 250–257.
- 1907: « Cérémonial cambodgien concernant la prise de fonctions des mandarins nouvellement promus », La revue indochinoise n°50, 31 janvier 1907, pp. 71–75.
- 1921–1923: « Prah Khan, (l’épée sacrée du Cambodge) », Arts et archéologie khmers, Augustin Challamel, Paris, tome 1, fascicule 1, pp. 59–63.
- 1930: Danses cambodgiennes, Hanoi, Imprimerie d’Extrême-Orient, 1930.
- 1956 : Danses Cambodgiennes, revised and augmented by Jeanne Cuisinier, Institut Bouddhique.
- 2006 : Voyage du roi Sisowath en France : En l'année du Cheval, huitième de la décade correspondant à l'année occidentale 1906, royaume du Cambodge, Traduit du khmer, présenté et annoté par Olivier de Bernon, Mercure de France.

== Awards ==
- Thiounn was given the honorary titles of Samdech Chaufea Veang by the Royal Palace of Cambodia
- Grand Officer of the Legion of Honor

== Bibliography ==
- Aberdam, Marie, « Samdech Veang Thiounn, (1864-1946), figure de l’interprète devenu haut-dignitaire du royaume khmer sous l’administration française », Bulletin de l’AEFEK (in French), n° 20, February 2015.
- Thun, Theara (June 2020). "The epistemological shift from palace chronicles to scholarly Khmer historiography under French colonial rule". Journal of Southeast Asian Studies. 51 (1–2): 132–153. doi:10.1017/s0022463420000235. ISSN 0022-4634. S2CID 225827319.
