= François Maspero =

French author and journalist

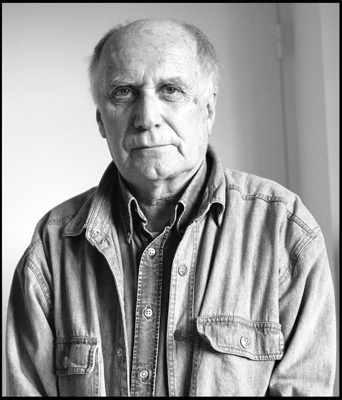
- François Maspero
- Born: 19 January 1932; Paris, France
- Died: 11 April 2015 (aged 83); Paris, France
- Occupations: Author, journalist
- Political party: French Communist Party (until 1956)
- Father: Henri Maspero

François Maspero (19 January 1932, in Paris – 11 April 2015, in Paris) was a French author and journalist, best known as a publisher of leftist books in the 1970s. He also worked as a translator, translating the works of Joseph Conrad, Mehdi Ben Barka, and John Reed, author of Ten Days that Shook the World, among others. He was awarded the Prix Décembre in 1990 for Les Passagers du Roissy-Express.

== Biography ==
François Maspero was born in 1932. His youth was marked by the cultural environment of his family, several of whom were noted scholars, and his parents' participation in the Resistance. His father, Henri Maspero, a sinologist and professor at the Collège de France, died at Buchenwald. His mother survived the Ravensbrück concentration camp. His grandfather, Gaston Maspero, who died before his birth, was a famous Egyptologist.

François Maspero opened a book store named L'Escalier in the Latin Quarter in 1955, at the age of 23. In the 1950s, he adhered to the French Communist Party (PCF). In 1956, he left the party's Parisian cell because of its support of the Soviet invasion of Hungary and its opposition to Algerian independence. In 1958, he broke with the party as a whole.

=== Éditions Maspero ===
Maspero took over the bookstore La Joie de Lire, located in the 5th arrondissement of Paris, in 1957. In 1959, in the middle of the Algerian War, he and Marie-Thérèse Maugis formed the Maspero publishing house, Éditions François Maspero. They were later joined by Jean-Philippe Bernigaud and Fanchita Gonzalez Batlle, and then by Émile Copfermann. Their first two collections, "Cahiers libres" and "Textes à l'appui", focused on the Algerian War from an anti-colonialist perspective, and on contestation of the PCF's unreformed Stalinism.

Maspero published Frantz Fanon's The Wretched of the Earth (1961), censored by the French authorities, with a preface by Jean-Paul Sartre, and Fanon's L'An V de la Révolution algérienne. Maspero published other testimonies on Algeria, including investigations of the use of torture by the French Army, also censored. Besides facing lawsuits as a result of his courageous publishing decisions, Maspero was the target of bomb attacks.

He republished Paul Nizan's Les Chiens de garde and Aden Arabie, also with a preface by Sartre. Then he created the review Partisans, which survived until 1973. Many important writers first came to public attention through the "Cahiers libres" collection, such as Régis Debray, published in 1967 or Bernard-Henri Lévy in 1973. Georges Perec published his first texts in Partisans. In the 1960s, Éditions Maspero paid particular attention to the problems of the Third World and of neo-colonialism, publishing among others books by Che Guevara.

In 1971, Maspero published Mongo Beti's Cruel hand on Cameroon, autopsy of a decolonization, which was censored by Minister of the Interior Raymond Marcellin at the request, brought forward by Jacques Foccart, of the Cameroon government, represented in Paris by ambassador (and author) Ferdinand Oyono. In 1975, he republished Jean Maitron's classic History of the anarchist movement in France (1880–1914). In the years 1967-82 he published the "Petite Collection Maspero" (Little Maspero Series). In 1983, Maspero publishing house was transformed into the publisher La Découverte, later bought by Vivendi Universal Publishing, later Editis.

=== After 1983 ===
In the 1990s and 2000s François Maspero published several reportages for the French newspaper Le Monde. In 2001, for example, he produced a long narrative about a summer passed on the Algerian coast with the title "Deux ou trois choses que j’ai vues de l’Algérie".

In 2009, at the 50th anniversary of the Éditions Maspero publishing house, an exposition in honor of Francois Maspero, "François Maspero et les paysages humains, " was organized by Bruno Guichard (Maison des Passages, Lyon) and Alain Léger (Librairie À plus d'un titre, Lyon) in the Musée de l'Imprimerie. In parallel to this exposition a book was edited as an exposition catalogue and Festschrift to honor live and work of Maspero. The title of the book was "François Maspero et les paysages humains" and it was edited by Bruno Guichard, Julien Hage and Alain Leger.

Maspero was criticized by Situationists such as Guy Debord, who used the term "masperize" to describe the falsification or corruption of a text, for instance by deleting segments from a quote without marking them.

== Works ==
- 1984 - Le Sourire du chat, translated as Cat's Grin
- L'ombre d'une photographe, Gerda Taro, Le Seuil (Paris, 2006) ISBN 2-02-085817-7
- 1990 - Les passagers du Roissy Express, with photographs by Anaïk Frantz. Seuil, Paris 1990. ISBN 2-02-012467-X . English edn. Roissy Express: a journey through the Paris suburbs, trans. Paul Jones. London: Verso, 1994, ISBN 0-86091-373-2.

== Selected books published by François Maspero ==
- Frantz Fanon's The Wretched of the Earth (1961)
- Fernand Oury and Aïda Vasquez. Vers une pédagogie institutionnelle (Towards an Institutional Pedagogy), 1968.

== See also ==
- Censorship in France
