= Bernard Col de Monteiro =

Khmer Catholic

Bernard Col de Monteiro (Khmer: ឧកញ៉ា កុលដឺម៉ុងតេរោ) was a Khmer Catholic of Portuguese descent who served the Cambodian monarchy during the second half of the 19th century, and was "one of the major mandarins of King Norodom" and a "member of the new-old national élite à la française" at the beginning the French protectorate of Cambodia.

== Background ==
Bernard Col de Monteiro is the most illustrious member of the de Monteiro family in Cambodia. The "de Monteiro" are the descendants of a family of Portuguese origin. The presence of a “de Monteiro” was confirmed at Ponhea Lu towards the end of the 17th century and the beginning of the 18th century. They are the remnants of the historical adventures of the Portuguese intervention in the Indochinese Peninsula since the 16th century. The Khmer-Portuguese mestizo or kon kat as they are called in Khmer retain Portuguese and Spanish family names to this day, while their physical appearance has moulded in with that of the locals.

== Biography ==
=== A Catholic family faithful to the King of Cambodia ===
Bernard Col de Monteiro was born around 1839 in the Catholic village of Ponhea Lu, close to the capital of Oudom, north of Phnom Penh. He was the son of Oknha Bernados Ros de Monteiro and Neang Chhun Elisabeth. In 1850, his father, Bernardo Ros, accompanied French missionary Charles-Émile Bouillevaux as he was the first Frenchman to discover the remains of Angkor Wat, which he later introduced to French explorer Henri Mouhot.

Bernard was sent to further his studies at the Catholic mission in Bangkok, and later to Singapore to learn English. He then enter the royal court of Phnom Penh and pledged allegiance at the service of King Ang Duong. As many Christians of Portuguese descent, Col de Monteiro found a niche as interpreter and secretary of the royal court of Cambodia where he began working in 1860.

Col de Monteiro was given as a Khmer language teacher to Ernest Doudart de Lagrée, leader of the French Mekong Expedition of 1866-1868, who described him in these words:

[Bernard Col de Monteiro] is a young Cambodian interpreter, extremely intelligent [...] who already knows English and that I am teaching French. He is eighteen years old, no nose like that of all his countrymen, beautiful red skin, silk pants that come above the knee and a gray felt hat that amazes the whole land.

— Ernest Doudart de Lagrée, 1863

Col de Monteiro kept an excellent reputation among the French as later in 1890, Adhémard Leclère had similar words of praise for the kings' secretary interpreter.

At the end of 1873, Col de Monteiro was involved in a commercial scam as his official signature was abusively used by "false count and quintessential carpetbagger", Frédéric Thomas-Caraman, one of the first French merchants established in Phnom Penh in the 1860s' who used the Khmer King's reputation to go on a shopping spree in Paris.

During the French intervention phase to weaken the secular authority of royal power from 1884 to 1886, Col de Monteiro was logically identified as loyal to Norodom and resistant to the French takeover of the country, and was removed under guard by order of Governor Charles Antoine François Thomson during Norodom's forced signature of the convention of 17 June 1884. The humiliation was such that some historians recorded that he was "thrown out the window" while his descendants recalled that he had to suffer long years in prison for standing up for the independence of Cambodia, both of which a mere crystallisation of a distant but painful memory.

=== Emergence of a competent Cambodian statesman ===
Between 1893 and 1895, Col de Monteiro served as Secretary of the Royal Treasury. At the instigation of the French authorities, in 1896, he became Minister of the Navy (Oknha Kralahom) and thus joined the Council of Ministers, despite resistance from King Norodom himself. In the 1897 coup d'état against King Norodom, this time, he supported with the other members of the council of ministers, including Prime Minister Oum, a second attempt by the French to neutralize the authority of the king. Faced with this act of high treason, King Norodom locked himself in his Palace feeling betrayed by his mandarins.

From there on, anti-monarchists historians such as Milton E. Osborne consider that Col de Monteiro answered directly to the French protectorate and became part of the King's "tame cabinet", submitted to the directions of the French. However, despite the king's grudge, Col continued to play a role in improving the relationship between the French and the Khmer administration. In 1903, Col de Monteiro was appointed Minister of Justice (Oknha Yomareach). In the company of Thiounn, Minister of the Palace, and Son Diep, de Monteiro accompanied King Sisowath on an official visit to France in 1906.

=== Glory as Minister of the Palace and downfall after the death of a polygamist ===
In 1907, after the death of Minister Poc, he was appointed to succeed him. Col de Monteiro would occupy this position for a fairly short time because he died in November or December 1908. He was replaced by Prince Sathavong, son of King Norodom, who had married his own niece, Neang Samreth de Monteiro. One of the couple's granddaughters is Neak Norodom Thavet Norleak, who became one of Norodom Sihanouk's wives, sealing once more the alliance of the de Monteiro clan and the royal dynasty of Cambodia.

As various claims were made to his large estate after his death, it appeared through a two-year judicial enquiry that Col de Monteiro had been living more than a double life as a polygamist, with a least eight women claiming posterity from him and fifteen more concubines, whom he kept for his entertainment to sing in his choir.

== Legacy ==
=== First translation of the Cambodian Royal Chronicles ===
French colonialist Doudart de Lagrée asked Col de Monteiro to transcribe into Latin the version of the royal chronicles of Cambodia attributed to the scholar Nong. When published in 1866, it was the first translation of the Cambodian Royal Chronicles in a foreign language, and the first history of Cambodia published in a foreign language. His transcription in Latin letters has been criticized for its lack of literal faithfulness to the original as it attempts to provide an optimistic way of telling history about Cambodia, in order to please the French.

=== Relationship between the Catholic Church and the monarchy of Cambodia ===
Col de Monteiro played a pivotal role in the construction of a good relationship between the Catholic Church in Cambodia and the Cambodian monarchy. Through his Catholic faith, his knowledge of languages and his position at the Royal palace, he was instrumental in facilitating the relationships between King Norodom and the French missionaries of that period.

As his grandfather who served as secretary of King Ang Chan II until his execution, he was one the most notorious Catholics in Cambodia, as were later Sosthene Fernandez, or currently, the Queen Monique of Cambodia.

Close to the Catholic church of Saint-Joseph in Phnom Penh, Street 72 still bears the name of Col de Monteiro as a sign of his legacy.

== Bibliography ==
- Thun, Theara (June 2020). "The epistemological shift from palace chronicles to scholarly Khmer historiography under French colonial rule". Journal of Southeast Asian Studies. 51 (1–2): 132–153. doi:10.1017/s0022463420000235. ISSN 0022-4634. S2CID 225827319.
- Hocdy, Khing (2013). “Col (alias Kol) de Monteiro (C.1839-1908). Parcours d’un interprète-mandarin”, Péninsule 67 (2):73-81.
- Phoeun, Mak (1980). "L'introduction de la Chronique royale du Cambodge du lettré Nong". Bulletin de l'École française d'Extrême-Orient. 67 (1): 135–145. doi:10.3406/befeo.1980.3344.
