= Michael Vickery =

American historian and author

- portrait of uncertain date and place
- Born: Michael Theodore Vickery; April 1, 1931; Billings, Montana, U.S.
- Died: June 29, 2017 (aged 86); Battambang Province, Cambodia
- Occupation: historian
- Spouse: Angina Vickery
- Children: 2

Michael Theodore Vickery (April 1, 1931 – June 29, 2017) was an American historian, lecturer, and author known for his works about the history of Southeast Asia.

== Life ==
Vickery was born on April 1, 1931, in Billings, Montana.

After acquiring a Bachelor of Arts in Russian studies from the University of Washington in 1952, Vickery became a Fulbright scholar in Finland from 1953 to 1955 before joining the United States Army in Germany from 1956 to 1958. He then taught English in Istanbul, Turkey, from 1958 to 1960, in Cambodia from 1960 to 1964, and in Laos from 1964 to 1967.

He carried out a thesis research in Cambodia and Thailand from 1970 to 1972 and halted it in 1973 when he became a lecturer in Southeast Asian history at the Universiti Sains Malaysia in Penang, Malaysia, where he worked until 1979. He resumed and completed the research in 1977, naming it Cambodia After Angkor: The Chronicular Evidence for the Fourteenth to Sixteenth Centuries. In the same year, Vickery received a Doctor of Philosophy in history from Yale University.

Following that, he became a research fellow in Southeast Asian history at the Australian National University from 1979 to 1982, a research fellow in Southeast Asian history at the University of Adelaide from 1982 to 1988, and a senior lecturer in Southeast Asian history at the Universiti Sains Malaysia from 1988 to 1998. He then taught Cambodian history at the Royal University of Fine Arts in Phnom Penh, Cambodia, from 1998 to 2002.

He worked as an independent scholar based in Chiang Mai Province, Thailand, from 2002 to 2008. The next year, he became a visiting professor at the School of Philosophical and Historical Inquiry, University of Sydney, where he worked until at least 2011.

On June 29, 2017, Vickery died of a heart attack at the age of 86 in Battambang Province, Cambodia, where his funeral was held for five days. He was survived by his Khmer-American wife, Angina Vickery, and his two daughters, Angelina and Mimi (the latter of whom is adopted).

== Work on Southeast Asian history ==
Vickery's research and writings have concentrated on ancient and modern history of Cambodia and Thailand with publications ranging from early history to contextual studies and interpretations of recent and contemporary Cambodia - being one of only a handful scholars, who comprehensively examined regional events during the 1980s.

Vickery essentially contributed to and helped to extend the scholarly debate of the Pre-Angkorian kingdoms, the classic age and the Post-Angkor Period, introducing and integrating the works of the Cambodian scholars Khin Sok and Mak Phoen by utilizing their alternative view-points. On the basis of volumes of previously non-deciphered epigraphic inscriptions, Vickery elaborated on the fact, that many works of earlier scholars, "...written 20 years ago may be simply refuted by the discovery or the deciphering of a [new] inscription". and further: "To study nowadays Cambodian history with [Georges] Coédès would amount to do geography with Ptolemy".

In 1984, he published his book "Cambodia 1975–1982" that covers the years of the Pol Pot era and its immediate aftermath.

Vickery's work has been described as falling into "Marxist schools of thought" by some scholars although he wasn't a communist. He is considered to be, and regularly cited as, a "Cambodia expert", one of the leading historians on Cambodian history and as a "giant of Southeast Asian scholarship".

Vickery was a member of the Bulletin of Concerned Asian Scholars. In Volume 21, 1989, he wrote:

"My first contribution (1982) to BCAS [Bulletin Of Concerned Asian Scholars] was on CIA falsification of Cambodian statistics. I believe the task of BCAS should be to counter U.S. regime misinformation and mainstream self-censorship, and provide well-researched progressive information on Asia and the Pacific...[sic]"

Vickery contributed a number of columns for the Phnom Penh Post from 1992 to 2007 during which time he engaged in political debate. In 2008 it was announced, that he had been working with former Khmer Rouge foreign minister Ieng Sary's defense team at the Khmer Rouge Tribunal, serving as an analyst and historical expert.

== Publications ==
=== Dissertation ===
- Cambodia After Angkor: The Chronicular Evidence for the Fourteenth to Sixteenth Centuries, Yale University, Ph.D., December 1977. Ann Arbor: University of Michigan, University Microfilms.

=== Books ===
- Cambodia 1975–1982, Boston, South End Press; Sydney, George Allen & Unwin, 1984; second edition, Chiang Mai, Silkworm Books, 1999.
- Kampuchea, Politics, Economics and Society, Frances Pinter (Publishers), London, Lynne Rienner Publishers, Inc., Boulder, 1986.
- Society, Economics and Politics in Pre-Angkor Cambodia: The 7th-8th Centuries, Tokyo, The Centre for East Asian Cultural Studies for Unesco, The Toyo Bunko, 1998.
- Cambodia: A Political Survey, Phnom Penh, Funan Press, 2007

=== Collections ===
- Kicking the Vietnam Syndrome in Cambodia, Collected Writings 1975–2010, published on-line, 2010

== See also ==
- History of Cambodia
- Post-Angkor Period
- Democratic Kampuchea
- People's Republic of Kampuchea
- Khin Sok
