= Jean Maspero =

French papyrologist (1885-1915)

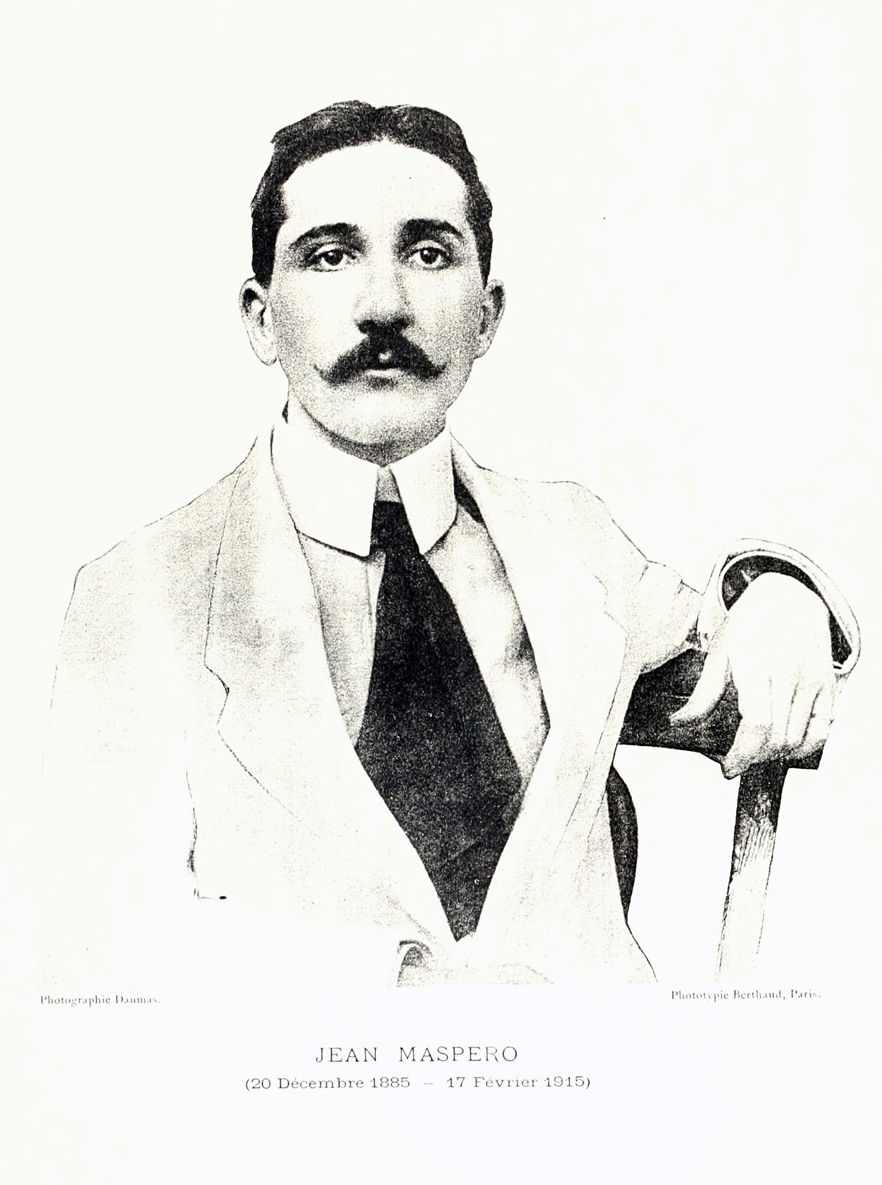
- Born: 20 December 1885; Paris
- Died: 15 February 1915 (aged 29); Vauquois
- Occupations: Egyptologist; Papyrologist

Jean Maspero (20 December 1885 – 17 February 1915) was an early 20th-century French papyrologist. He was the son of Egyptologist Gaston Maspero and his wife née Louise d'Estournelles de Constant (sister of Paul d'Estournelles de Constant, winner of the 1909 Nobel Peace Prize) and brother of Henri and Georges Maspero.

== Works ==
- 1912: Organisation militaire de l'Égypte Byzantine, In-8, 157 p. (Paris, Éditions Honoré Champion)
- 1914: Horapollon et la fin du paganisme égyptien, Bulletin de l‘Institut Français d'Archéologie Orientale, n° 11, (p. 163–195).
- 1916: Papyrus grecs d'époque Byzantine, Catalogue général des antiquités égyptiennes, imprimerie de l‘Institut français d'archéologie orientale,
- Maspero, J.; Wiet, G. (1919). MIFAO 36 1e série fasc.2 - Matériaux pour servir à la géographie de l'Égypte (in French). Cairo: Impr. de l'Institut français d'archéologie orientale.
- 1932: Fouilles exécutées à Bawit by Jean Maspero, notes ordered and edited by Étienne Drioton. Premier fascicule, Institut français d'archéologie orientale.

== Bibliography ==
- Bibliographie Altagypten 1822-1946, Christine Beinlich-Seeber, Harrassowitz 1998
- Ostraca grecs et coptes des fouilles de Jean Maspero à Baouit, O.BawitIFAO 1-67 et O.Nancy (Bibl. d'Études Coptes, 17). Boud'hors Anne, Cairo, 2004.
