= Norodom of Cambodia =

King of Cambodia from 1860 to 1904

Norodom
- Preah Sovannakaot
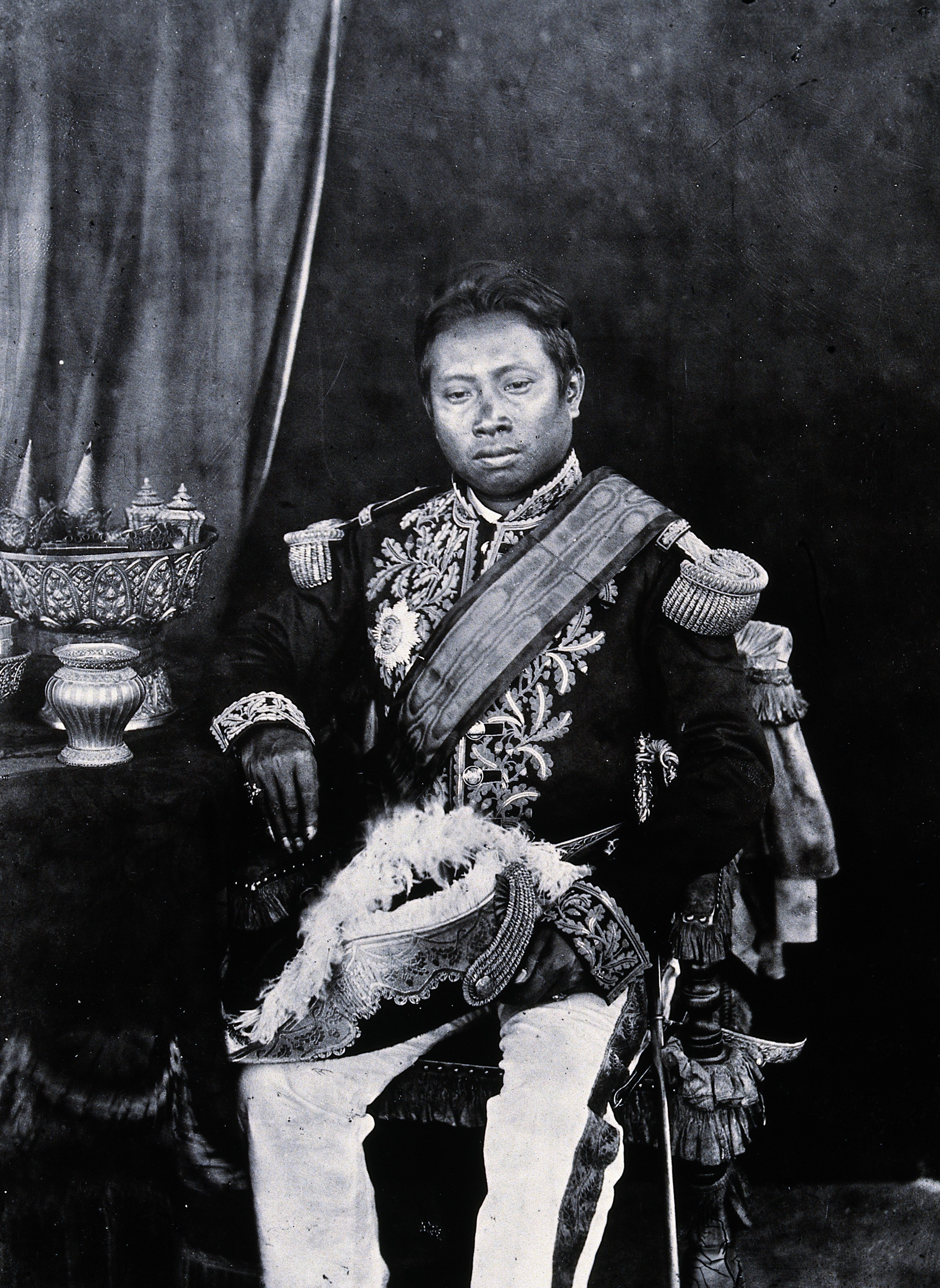
- Portrait by John Thomson, 1866

King of Cambodia
- Reign: 19 October 1860 – 24 April 1904
- Coronation: 3 June 1864
- Predecessor: Ang Duong
- Successor: Sisowath
- Born: Ang Voddey; 3 February 1834; Angkor Borei, Cambodia
- Died: 24 April 1904 (aged 70); Royal Palace, Phnom Penh, Cambodia, French Indochina
- Spouse: 47
- Issue: 61, including Norodom Yukanthor
- House: Norodom
- Father: Ang Duong
- Mother: Ksatrey Pen
- Religion: Theravada Buddhism

Modern kings of Cambodia
- Ang Duong
- Norodom
- Sisowath
- Sisowath Monivong
- Norodom Sihanouk (first reign)
- Norodom Suramarit
- Sisowath Kossamak (ceremonial queen)
- Norodom Sihanouk (second reign)
- Norodom Sihamoni

Norodom (Khmer: ព្រះនរោត្តម, Nôroŭttâm [nɔˈroːɗɑm]; born Ang Voddey (Khmer: អង្គវតី, Ângk Vôtei [ʔɑŋ ʋɔˈtəj]); 3 February 1834 – 24 April 1904) was King of Cambodia from 19 October 1860 until his death in 1904. He was the eldest son of King Ang Duong and was a half-brother of Si Votha and King Sisowath. He was elected to the throne in 1860 but would not be crowned until 1864 because Siam held the royal regalia (the royal crown and other artifacts).

In 1863, he signed a treaty with France by giving France control over Cambodia's foreign relations in exchange for personal protection against his enemies. The treaty saved Cambodian independence, but French control over Cambodia's internal affairs strengthened continually until the end of his reign (full independence was not restored until 1953). His reign of 43 years and 188 days is the longest in Cambodian history in terms of verifiable exact date. Upon his death, he was succeeded by his half-brother, Sisowath.

He is the progenitor of the House of Norodom which has been the ruling royal house of Cambodia since 1860.

== Name ==
Norodom's royal name was Norodom Prohmbarirak (Khmer: នរោត្ដម ព្រហ្មបរិរក្ស), previously, Ang Reacheavoddey (Khmer: អង្គរាជាវតី). He is referred to as Ang Voddey in some Western accounts. His posthumous title is Preah Karuna Preah Sovannakot (Khmer: ព្រះករុណាព្រះសុវណ្ណកោដ្ឋ).

== Rule ==
=== Background: Cambodia from Ang Eng to Ang Duong ===
King Norodom's grandfather, King Ang Eng, died in early 1797. He left four sons, of whom the eldest, Ang Chan II, became king, but as Chan was a minor on his father's death his coronation was delayed until 1806 when he turned 16. Chan quarreled with his overlord the king of Siam Rama II and with his brothers, and the remainder of his reign was filled with wars between Chan's new overlord, the emperor of Vietnam Gia Long and Minh Mang, and the Thais, fought largely in the territory of Cambodia. Chan died in 1834, but the wars continued until 1847 when they ended with a peace treaty between Siam and Vietnam under which Chan's youngest brother, Ang Duong (Norodom's father), was recognized as king–the other two brothers were dead by this time.

Ang Duong's reign, from 1848 (the year of his coronation, although his reign began in 1847 and he had claimed the throne even earlier) until his death in 1860 did much to restore the country, which had suffered much in the previous three decades.

=== Early life and accession ===
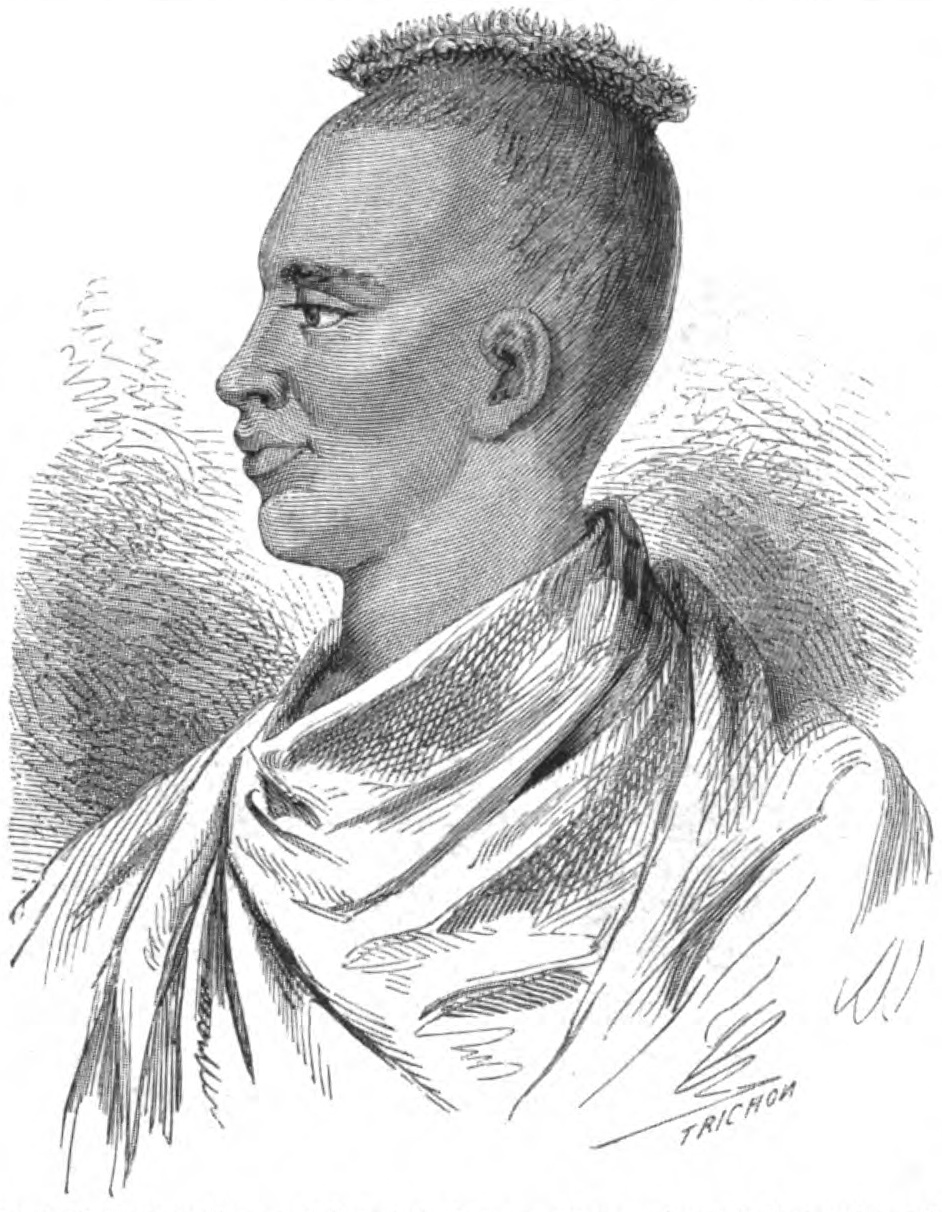
Norodom the "second king" (viceroy) of Cambodia in 1859.

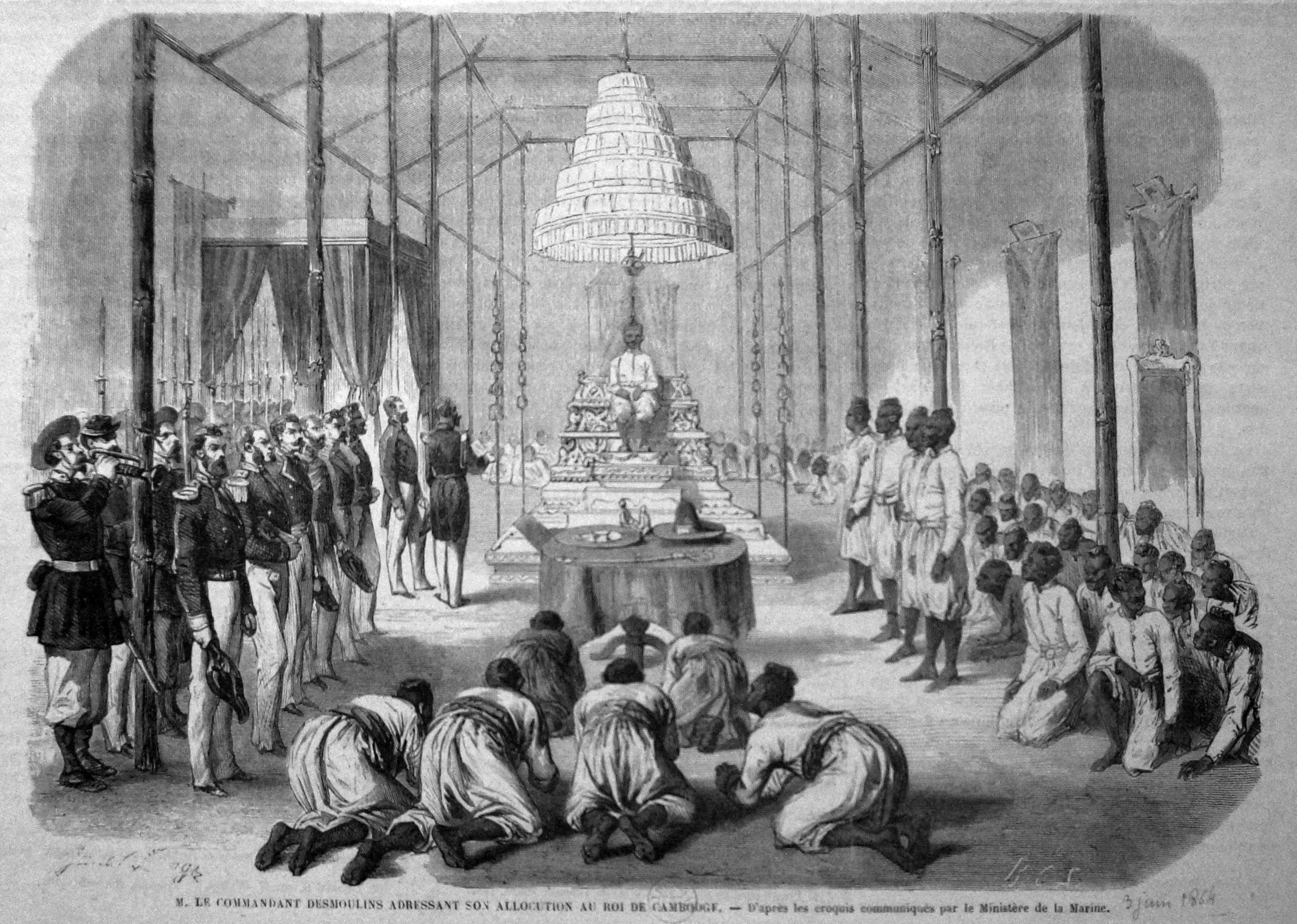
Coronation of Norodom, 3 June 1864

Norodom was the eldest son of Ang Duong. In 1850, he and his half-brother Prince Sisowath were sent to study in Bangkok by their father Ang Duong, where they grew up near members of the Siamese royal family. In 1857, Norodom (Prince Phrom Borirak) served in the Royal Siamese Army as a military adviser, for which later he was awarded the Order of the White Elephant.

In 1861, Norodom's half-brother Si Votha rebelled and Norodom abandoned the capital of Oudong and fled to safety in Bangkok. The Siamese court returned him to Phnom Penh early in 1862, and in 1863 he signed a treaty with the French placing himself under French protection. Initially, in a desperate attempt to show that Cambodia was still under their control, the Siamese withheld the crown jewels of Cambodia, which Khmer monarchs needed to become a legitimate ruler of Cambodia. This was a problem, and the French sent a steamboat up the Chao Phraya river to Bangkok. After French military pressure, the Siamese reluctantly returned the crown jewels to Cambodia, and it was the French who crowned Norodom, finally freeing Cambodia from Siamese control in 1867.

== French protectorate ==
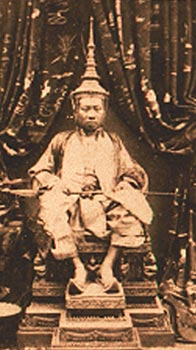
Photo of Norodom in his coronation ceremony in Bangkok after Siam returned crown and jewels.

On 17 June 1884, French authorities forced King Norodom to sign a treaty that consolidated their position in Cambodia by forcing him to give up control of public revenue, customs taxes, and public works. Norodom resisted but with French gunboats anchored outside the Royal Palace he had no choice but to sign. The French actions caused widespread anger throughout the country. In 1885, Prince Si Votha, Norodom's half-brother, led a revolt against the French rule. The French suspected Norodom secretly supported Si Votha's actions and blamed him for inciting the revolts. The revolt ended when King Norodom assured the Cambodians that the French had offered concessions to him. After the restoration of the 1885–86 revolt, Norodom was temporarily strong. To prevent another revolt, the French were less inclined to force the king to the wall once more.

After the 1897 coup d'état against his person, he lost confidence in his closest collaborators namely Thiounn and Bernard Col de Monteiro who were appointed as Ministers without his consent.

Following the Sino-French War (1884–1885), French Indochina was formed in October 1887 from Annam, Tonkin, Cochinchina (who together form modern Vietnam) and the Kingdom of Cambodia.

Norodom was a puppet of the French for the remainder of his rule. Before he died in 1904, he appointed his son, Prince Norodom Yukanthor, as heir apparent to the throne. But Yukanthor had a fall-out with the French and did not succeed to the throne. Norodom died in the palace in Phnom Penh in April 1904; his body was cremated in the traditional Buddhist fashion in 1906. His half-brother Sisowath succeeded him.

== Reforms ==
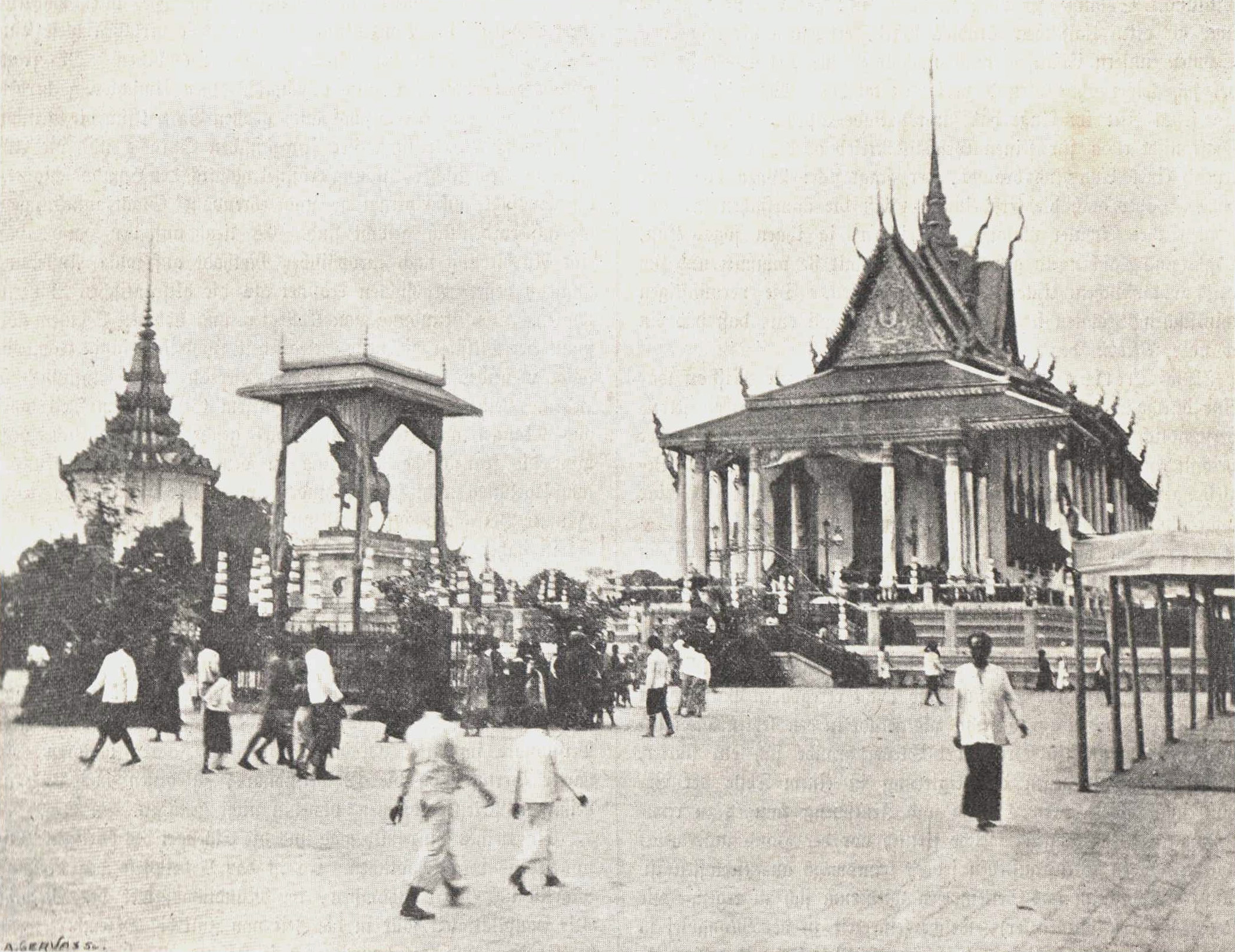
The Silver Pagoda was constructed under King Norodom's reign

Throughout Norodom's reign, several administrative and judicial reforms were improved in the kingdom. The reduction of provinces was imposed to help reduce administrative costs. He also followed King Chulalongkorn and abolished commercial monopolies, slavery and civil lists for the royal family. During his reign, certain agricultural products such as betel, pepper and sugar costs were reduced.

== Legacy ==
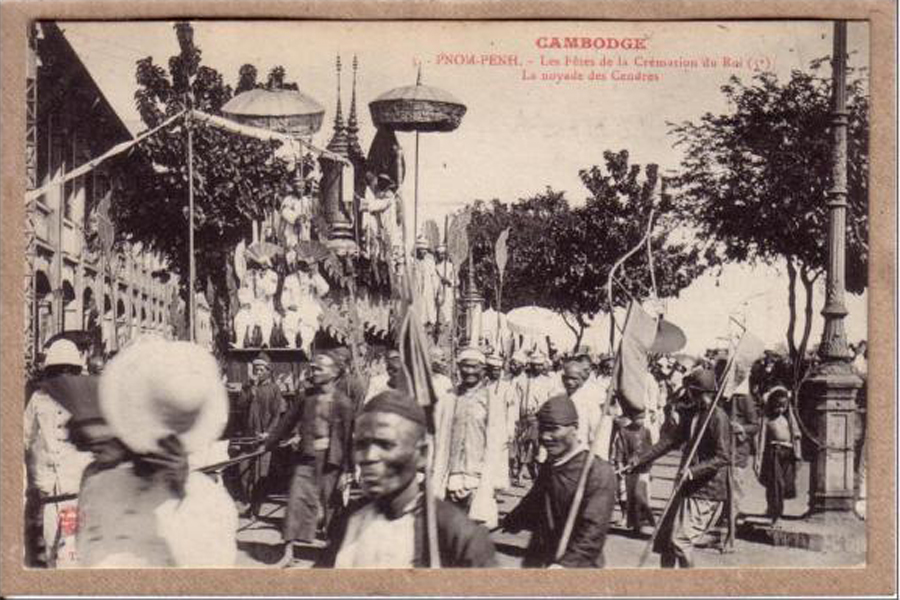
Funeral procession of King Norodom in 1906

King Norodom was remembered for his appreciation and fondness of the arts. It was under his supervision that the Silver Pagoda was built in 1892, as well as Wat Oudong consecrated on 6 June 1875. When Norodom assumed the throne in 1860, classical dance recovered some of its ancient prestige. It soon became a great honour for court officials, ministers, and senior dignitaries to have their children admitted to the palace's school of dancing.

In 1872, Norodom went on an official visit to Hong Kong, Manila, and Singapore. In Manila, the King was greatly impressed by the musical skills of the Filipinos and decided to take some musicians back to Cambodia to teach modern music. Norodom's generosity began drawing artists from many nationalities to Cambodia and they were always given a warm welcome at the royal palace and court. Most of them had a deep interest in the Royal Ballet and thus were given every opportunity to learn Khmer music and dance.

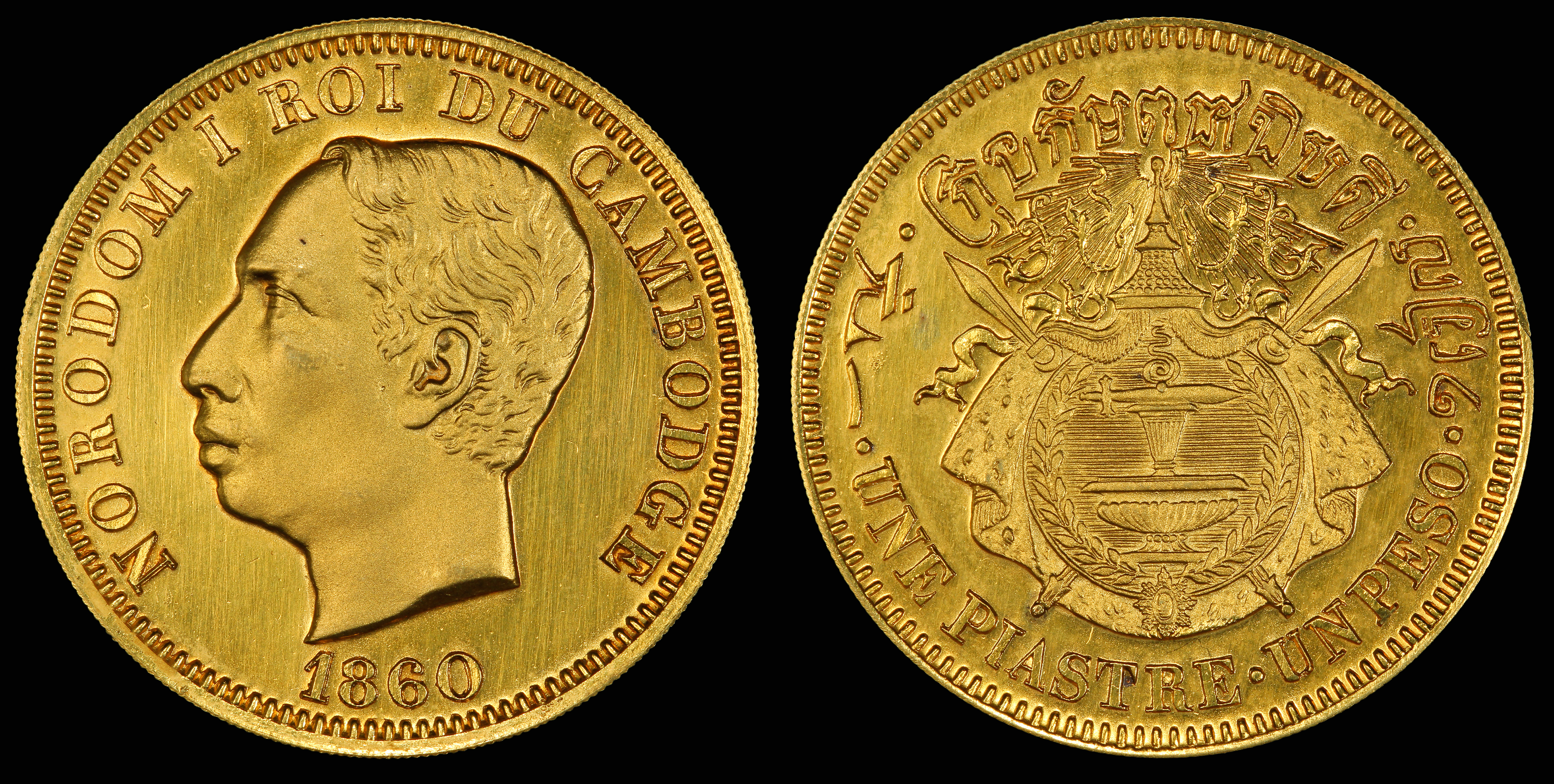
1860 gold piastre depicting King Norodom I the year he assumed the throne

Under King Norodom, the beginnings of the Royal Khmer Navy were established for territorial protection.

== Honours ==
- Grand Croix of the Légion d'honneur-1872 (Grand Officier-1869) (Chevalier-1865) (France)

Norodom of Cambodia House of Norodom Born: February 1834 Died: 24 April 1904
Regnal titles
Preceded by Ang Duong	King of Cambodia; 1860 – 1904	Succeeded by Sisowath
