= Cambodian Royal Chronicles =

Collection of 18th- and 19th-century historical manuscripts

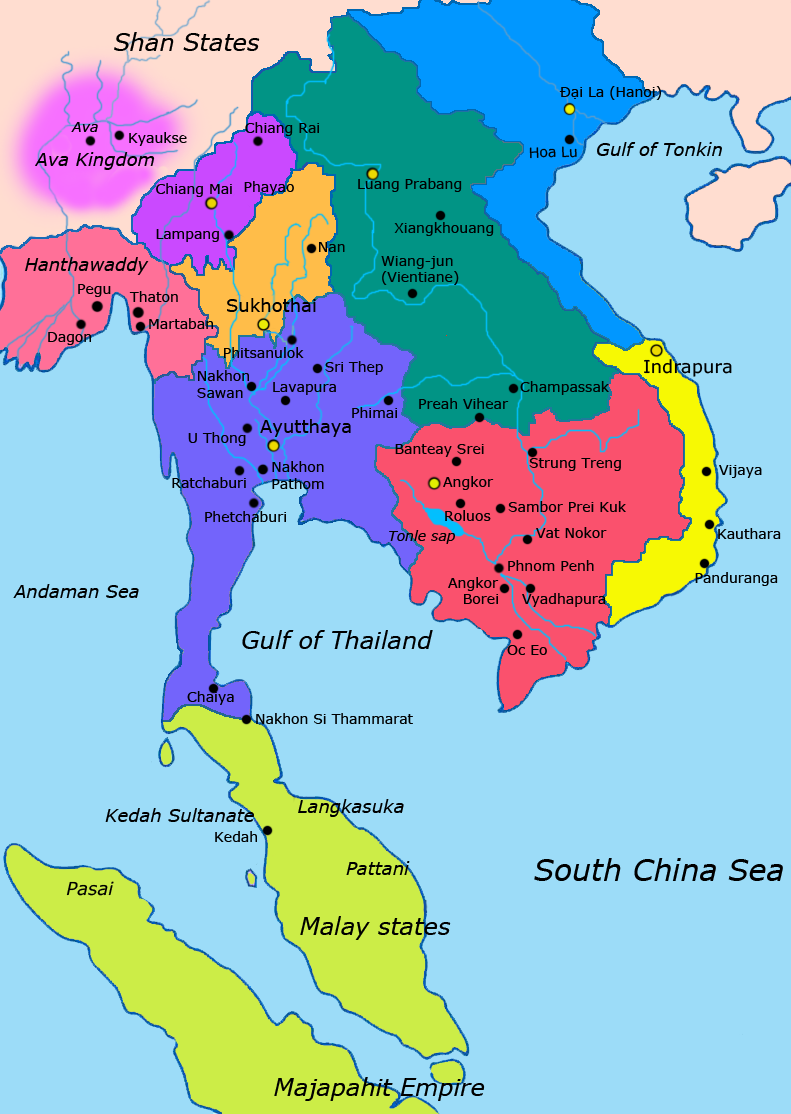
15th century map of mainland Southeast Asia

The Cambodian Royal Chronicles or Cambodian Chronicles (Rajabansavatar or Rapa Ksatr) are a collection of 18th and 19th century historical manuscripts that focus on the time from around the year 1430 to the beginning of the 16th century. This period of Cambodia's history is considered to be the Middle Periods, as it marks the end of the Khmer Empire. Written sources such as Sanskrit epigraphy become obsolete, beginning in the first half of the 14th century. Even Old Khmer inscriptions are absent until the middle of the 16th century. The last king mentioned in the ancient inscriptions of Angkor is King Jayavarman Parameshwara (or Jayavarma-Paramesvara), who reigned from 1327 to 1336.

The manuscripts (Sastra Slek Rit) on palm leaves and bound together in bundles are only short-lived. Surviving texts are copies and in many cases only fragments remain. The chronicles begin in 1796 and last far into the 19th century. Records tackle with the chronology of the kings, foreign affairs, relations to neighboring countries, internal conflicts among the Khmer kings, civil wars, controversies over royal succession and marriage and leadership issues among others.

The study of these texts is said to have been "time-consuming and requires a great deal of scholarship to properly organize and interpret the valuable information to be found within" with respect to the ongoing debate on the reasons and events of the abandonment of Angkor, the shifting of the Khmer capital and the general cultural decline.

== Etymology ==
Rajabansavatar consists of: raja = “king or royal”; bansa, vamça = “ancestry, lines”; and avatara = “descendant, incarnation”, or savatar is derived from bansavatar or sauvatar which means “history”. In Khmer, the roots combine into rajabansavatar, meaning “history of the royal ancestries” or “history of the kings”.

Rapa Ksatr is also called rapal ksatr or lpar ksatr (derivative of rapa ksatr) or sometimes ampal ksatr, “all the kings”. It can be divided as follows: rapa = jumbuor, juor, “lines” and ksatr = “prince, king”; therefore, rapa ksatr or rioen rapa ksatr means “history of the lines or ancestries of the kings”. The meaning of rajabansavatar or rapa ksatr can be translated as “annals” or “royal chronicles”, writings which are related to the history of the kings.

== Manuscripts ==
Originals seem to have undergone translations from liturgical language into contemporary Khmer, as scholar J. Moura states: "The texts were written in Pali and we carefully translated them by the letter... "

The manuscripts known as KK (1869), SP (1878), VJ (1934), No. 1049 (1835), and No. 1613 (1855) are in the Buddhist Institute library in Phnom Penh; given their extreme fragility people are not allowed to access them as a general rule. B39/5 (1818) and P3 (a copy of KK) are in Paris.

There exist around thirty-four copies of chronicles in Khmer language, along with three texts transcribed in Latin (systeme des missionaires) in the French National Library.

Version 2 - The oldest chronicle, 'The Fragment of Ang Eng', offered to King Rama I dating to 1796, was translated into Thai language, as such it remains in Bangkok. It only describes the reign of Param Nibbanapad (or Maha Nibbanapad) (1346-1351) to the reign of Paramaraja I (Cau Bana Yat) (1434-1438). Composition of a new chronicle was an integral part of any royal restoration.

Further works are the complete chronicle of Ukana Vansa Sarbejn Nan (or Nan in short), the complete chronicle of Somdach Veang Thiounn (or VJ, or Thiounn or Juon in short), the chronicle of Vatt Kok Kak(KK) and the Ampal Ksatr.

The chronicle of Nan was ordered by King Ang Cand (1797-1835), written in 1818. It was copied and revised into at least 4 versions. Another version of Nan’s chronicle was copied and revised by prince Nopparat in 1878 (son of King Ang Duong), called “Chronicle of Nopparat”, who added new information and changed some of the dates of the events.

Nong tradition - The Nong chronicle 1818 composed by Oknha Vongsa Sarapech (Nong) at the court of Ang Chan (1806–35) covering the period of 1414 to 1800. The basis for Francis Garnier's translation in journal asiatique (1871—72).

The "SrokSreh - Amazing Angkor Wat Channel" has published a brief survey called "Setting the Khmer chronicles" presenting the plots of and/or additional information on a number of the chronicles.

== Copies & Translations ==
Copies of the years 1818, 1869, 1878, 1903, 1934, 1941 and 1966, now being stored in the Departement des Manuscriptes in Paris, greatly vary in form and layout. The copy of 1818 was first translated in French by Ernest Doudart de Lagrée and published by Francis Garnier (Chronique Royale du Cambodge, 1871). The 1880 translation of Étienne Aymonier (Chroniques des anciens rois du Cambodge, 1880) was re-translated by J. Moura in 1883 Le royaume du Cambodge). In 1904 Étienne Aymonier published Le Cambodge, another translation of the Chronicles related to studies of Chinese historiography and European authors of the era.

Georges Maspero publishes L'empire kmer, histoire et document in 1904.

Martine Piat publishes the Chroniques Royales Khmer in 1974.

In 1988 Cambodian scholar Khin Sok published his work "Chroniques royales du Cambodge (De Banà Yàt jusqu’à la prise de Lanvaek de 1417 à 1595). Traduction française avec comparaison des différences version et introduction" and in 1981 fellow scholar Mak Phoeun publishes "Chroniques royales du Cambodige: De 1594 à 1677. Paris: École Française d'Extreme-Orient." Both worked on a systemic and contextual revision and reinterpretation of former French translations which greatly enhanced the historical value of these sources.

Chronological Charts of Nan’s Chronicle
Number	Names	Events	Rule	Genealogy
1	Nibbanapad		1345/6-1350	unrelated to previous kings
2	Siddhana(raja)		1350-(3months)	younger brother of 1
3	Lambanraja		1350-1353	son of 2
4	Cau Pa Sat	invasion	1353-1355	son of Siam King Ramadhipati
5	Cau Pa At		1355-1357	brother of 4
6	Cau Ktumpan Bisi		1357-	youngest son of Ramadhipati (1 month)
7	Sri Suriyovans		1357-1366	nephew of 3
8	Param Rama		1366-1370	nephew of 7
9	Dhammasokaraj		1370-1373	brother of 8
10	Indaraja	invasion	1373-	son of Siam King Baramraja

Chronological Charts of Chronicle of Samtec Cauva Vamn Juon
Number	Names	Events	Rule	Genealogy
1	Nibbanapad		1340-1345	son of Ta Trasak Pha-Em (in legend)
2	Siddhana(raja)		1345-(3 months)	younger brother of 1
3	LaMba(raja)		1346-1348	son of 2
4	Suriyodait	invasion by Siam King Ramadhipati	1349-1362 (1353-1354: Escaped from the city)	son of 1, cousin of 3
5	Cau Pa Sat		1353-1354	son of Siam king Ramadhipati
6	Cau Pa At		1354-(3 months)	brother of 5
7	Cau KtumpanBis		1354-(1 month)	youngest son of Ramadhipati
8	Param Rama		1362-1372	son of 3
9	Dhammasokaraj		1372-1400	brother of 8
10	Sri Suriyovans		1400-1413	son of 4
11	Param Sokara		1413-1416	son of 9
12	Indaraja	invasion	1416-(5 months	son of Siam King Baramraja

== The “Middle Period” ==
Most chronicles refer to the era from around the middle of the 14th century to the beginning of the 16th century as the “Middle Period” of Cambodian history; as to be post-Angkorean and pre-modern. Some historians apply this term to the entire period of the Middle Period.

According to the chronicle of Nan this period began in 1346 under the reign of King Param Nibbanapad. The chronicle of VJ starts in 1340, roughly 6 years earlier than the Nan records.

King Param Nibbanapad reigned from the year 1346 to 1351 (Nan chronicle). No information is given on how he relates to the last King of the Khmer Empire - Jayavarman Parameshwara.

== Historical accuracy ==
In cross-reference with external sources - Thai, Laos and China - and applying the degree of precision of these sources - conflicts with dating emerge, in particular during the 14th and the 15th century, significant regional military and political events remain unrecorded. On the other hand, many texts give unusually detailed accounts of controversies and conflicts among the royal families, to the point of explicit evaluation of leadership and blaming weak monarchs for national misfortunes. Some scholars dismiss these recordings as to be unhistorical - as facts are obviously missing, authors tend to create stories and adopt legends in order to fill gaps. Dates, length and degree of Thai incursions and occupation vary among the chronicles. Events surrounding the fall of Angkor, the role and the actions of the king and the elite are obscure.

David Chandler argues that in the case of the "Tiounn Chronicle", compiled between 1928 and 1934 by palace minister Tiounn, [He]"...drew on a range of earlier chronicles..." and are written "...from a king's perspective, between mythical times and the accession of King Sisowath Monivong(1927)...", offering no interpretation. The printed version, published only a decade later, omits material of the original. He quotes author Michael Vickery, when he remarks, that "...chronicles, including this one, that treat events earlier than 1550 cannot be verified, and were often copied from Thai chronicles about Thailand..."

As the chronicles are the prime national source of the immediate post-Angkorean period many historians give only vague statements on the events that accompany the decline of Angkor as a capital. Nonetheless, scholar Nhim Sotheavin emphasizes the practicalities: "However, the evaluation and careful consideration of the chronicles, other external sources and secondary scholarship will help to clarify its position as a transitional feature of Cambodian history, and a significant source of study."

== See also ==
- History of Cambodia
- Post-Angkor Period
- List of monarchs of Cambodia
- Khmer language
- Literature of Cambodia

== Bibliography ==
- Garnier, F. (1871). Chronique Royale du Cambodge. Paris.
- Vickery, M. (1977). Cambodia after Angkor: the Chronicular Evidence for the fourteenth to sixteenth centuries. Yale University.
- de Berval, René (1959). Kingdom of the Million Elephants and of the White Parasol. Saigon.
- Cœdès, G. (1937). Inscription du Cambodge, 8 volumes. Hanoi-Paris.
- Simon, W. (1966). Chronology during the Fourteenth and the Fifteenth Centuries, Asia Major, Volume XII. London.
- Palmer Briggs, Lawrence (1948). Siamese Attacks on Angkor Before 1430e. Washington D.C.
