= Henri Maspero =

French sinologist (1883–1945)

- Born: Henri Paul Gaston Maspero; 15 December 1883; Paris, France
- Died: 17 March 1945 (aged 61); Buchenwald concentration camp, Nazi Germany
- Scientific career
- Fields: Daoism, Chinese history
- Institutions: La Sorbonne; École Pratique des Hautes Études
- Academic advisors: Édouard Chavannes; Sylvain Lévi

Chinese name
- Traditional Chinese: 馬伯樂
- Simplified Chinese: 马伯乐
Transcriptions
Standard Mandarin
- Hanyu Pinyin: Mǎ Bólè
- Wade–Giles: Ma Po-lê

Henri Paul Gaston Maspero (15 December 1883 – 17 March 1945) was a French sinologist and professor who contributed to a variety of topics relating to East Asia. Maspero is best known for his pioneering studies of Daoism. He was imprisoned by the Nazis during World War II and died in the Buchenwald concentration camp.

== Life and career ==
Henri Maspero was born on 15 December 1883 in Paris, France. His father, Gaston Maspero, was a famous French Egyptologist of Italian ancestry. After completing his studies in history and literature in 1905, he joined his father in Egypt and later published Les Finances de l'Egypte sous les Lagides ("The Finances of Egypt under the Ptolemies"). After returning to Paris in 1907, he studied the Chinese language under Édouard Chavannes and law at Institut national des langues et civilisations orientales. In 1908 he went to Hanoi to study at the École française d'Extrême-Orient.

In 1918 he succeeded Édouard Chavannes as the chair of Chinese at the Collège de France. He published his monumental La Chine Antique ("Ancient China") in 1927. During the following years he replaced Marcel Granet as the chair of Chinese civilisation at the Sorbonne, directed the department of Chinese religions at the École pratique des hautes études, and was selected to be a member of the Académie des inscriptions et belles-lettres.

On 26 July 1944, Maspero and his wife, who were still living in Nazi-occupied Paris, were arrested because of their son's involvement with the French Resistance. Maspero was sent to the Buchenwald concentration camp, where he endured its brutal conditions for over six months before dying on 17 March 1945, aged 61, only three weeks before the camp's liberation by the U.S. Third Army.

== See also ==
- Georges Maspero (1872–1942), French sinologist, son of Gaston, brother of Henri and Jean
- Jean Maspero (1885–1915), French papyrologist, brother of Henri and Georges
- François Maspero (1932–2015), French author, journalist and publisher, son of Henri
