= Gaston Maspero =

French Egyptologist (1846–1916)

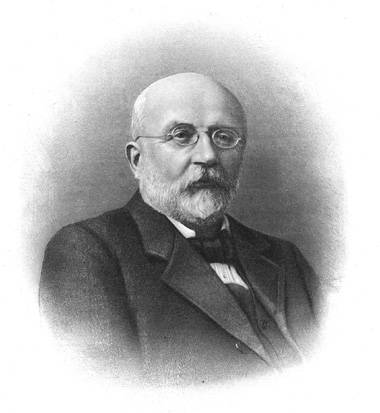
- Born: Gaston Camille Charles Maspero; 23 June 1846; Paris, France
- Died: 30 June 1916 (aged 70); Paris, France
- Occupation: Egyptology
- Predecessor: Auguste Mariette
- Spouse(s): Harriett Yapp (1871-1873); Louise Balluet d'Estournelles de Constant de Rebecque (1880-)
- Children: Georges Maspero; Harriett Maspero; Henri Maspero; Jean Maspero
- Relatives: François Maspero, grandson

Sir Gaston Camille Charles Maspero KCMG (23 June 1846 – 30 June 1916) was a French Egyptologist and director general of excavations and antiquities for the Egyptian government. Widely regarded as the foremost Egyptologist of his generation, he began his career teaching Egyptian language in Paris becoming a professor at the Collège de France. In 1880, he led an archaeological mission to Egypt, which later became the Institut Français d'Archéologie Orientale.

In 1881, Maspero's investigation led to the discovery of a hidden tomb near Dayr al-Baḥrī, containing 40 mummies, including pharaohs Seti I, Amenhotep I, Thutmose III, and Ramses II. His study of these findings was published in Les Momies royales de Deir-el-Bahari (1889). After a brief period in Paris, he returned to Egypt to organize a vast collection of antiquities at a museum in Cairo's Būlāq district, which later became the foundation of the Egyptian Museum established in 1902. During his second tenure as director general (1899–1914), Maspero regulated excavations, combated illicit trade, preserved monuments, and oversaw the archaeological survey of Nubia.

Maspero was highly regarded for his versatility and contributions to Egyptology. He authored the comprehensive Histoire ancienne des peuples de l’Orient classique (1895–1897) and was the first editor and translator of the Pyramid Texts, known as the Book of the Dead. His work extended to art, mythology, and religion, influencing many through his role as editor of the Recueil de travaux and Director of the Egyptian Service des Antiquités. Maspero's son, Henri Maspero, became a notable sinologist and scholar of East Asia.

== Early life ==
Gaston Maspero was born in Paris in 1846 to Adela Evelina Maspero, who had been born in Milan in 1822, daughter of a Milanese printer, and of an unnamed father, but identified by family tradition with Camillo Marsuzi de Aguirre, Italian revolutionary on the run. Maspero was educated at the Lycée Louis-le-Grand and at a Jesuit boarding school, followed by university studies at the École Normale Supérieure.

While at school he showed a special taste for history and became interested in Egypt following a visit to the Egyptian galleries of the Louvre at the age of fourteen. At university he excelled in Sanskrit as well as hieroglyphics. It was while Maspero was in final year at the École normale in 1867 that friends mentioned his skills at reading hieroglyphics to Egyptologist Auguste Mariette, who was in Paris as commissioner for the Egyptian section of the Exposition universelle. Mariette gave him two newly discovered hieroglyphic texts of considerable difficulty to study, and the young self-taught scholar produced translations of them in less than a fortnight, a great feat in those days when Egyptology was still almost in its infancy. The publication of these texts in the same year established his academic reputation.

== Career ==
In 1869 Maspero became a teacher (répétiteur) of Egyptian language and archeology at the École pratique des hautes études.

Maspero fought in the defence of France in the Franco-Prussian war of 1870-71 and was granted French citizenship in recognition of his service. In January 1873 he presented the first doctoral thesis on Egyptology in France. In 1874 he was appointed to the chair of Champollion at the Collège de France, succeeding Emmanuel de Rougé.

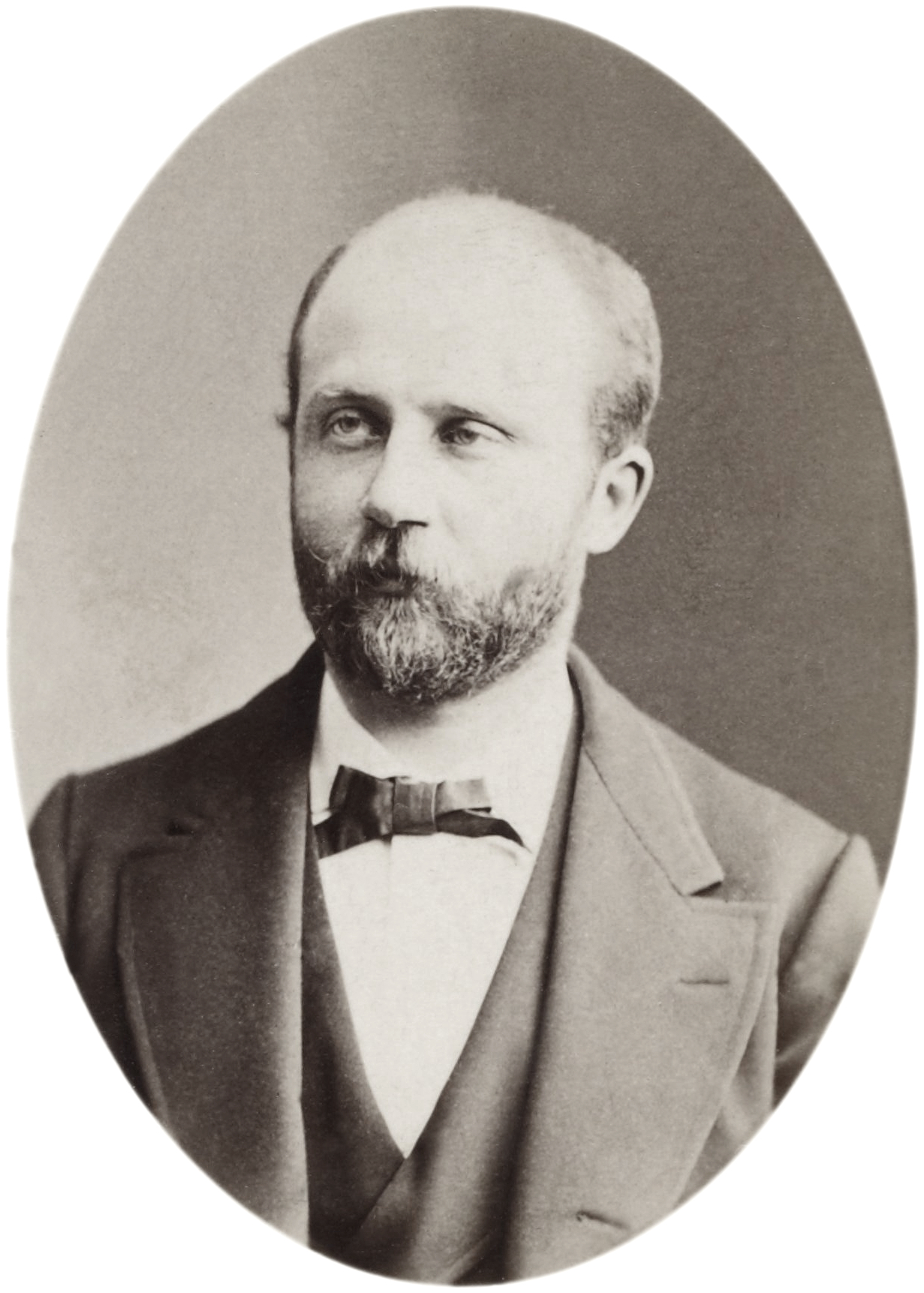
Maspero, 1883

By the end of the 1870s he was regarded as the leading French Egyptologist of his generation. In November 1880 Maspero went to Egypt as head of an archeological mission sent there by the French government, which ultimately developed into the well-equipped Institut français d'archéologie orientale. This occurred a few months before the death of Mariette, whom Maspero then succeeded as director-general of excavations and of the antiquities of Egypt. Maspero later claimed he only took the position to prevent it falling out of French hands by being given to Emile Brugsch, who was German. After a brief vacation back in France to organise his affairs Maspero returned to Egypt in September 1881 to take up his position.

Aware that his reputation was then more as a linguist than an archaeologist, Maspero's first work in the post was to build on Mariette's achievements at Saqqara. He expanded their scope from the early Old Kingdom to the later, with particular interest in tombs with long and complete hieroglyphic inscriptions that could help illustrate the development of the Egyptian language. Selecting five later Old Kingdom tombs, he was successful in that aim, finding over 4,000 lines of hieroglyphics which were then sketched and photographed. In 1882 he led the first excavation at Lisht which resulted in the discovery of the eroded Pyramid of Amenemhet I. He dispatched Emile Brugsch to Luxor to supervise the removal of a cache of royal mummies that had recently been found. Basing himself on his official streamer Maspero himself took charge of work at Zawiyet el-Aryan, Dahshur and Meidum. In October he had to endure a three-week long bout of dysentery, and before the end of that same year had fallen down a tomb-shaft, had an attack of rheumatism and a minor stroke.

Maspero also began plans to clear out the Luxor Temple. This would require compensating the owners of the various houses that had been constructed against, inside and on top of the temple. As the Antiquities Service was desperately short of funds he negotiated with Thomas Cook to introduce a visitors tax (later changed to an entry ticket) but this was insufficient. He appealed to the British colonial authority but Sir Colin Scott-Moncreiff, undersecretary of state at the Ministry of Public Works rejected his petition, claiming it was the practice in England for undertakings such as this to be funded by personal donations. A public appeal raised enough funds to commence clearance of the temple in 1884.

As an aspect of his attempt to curtail the rampant illegal export of Egyptian antiquities by tourists, collectors and agents for the major European and American museums, Maspero arrested the Abd al-Russul brothers from the notorious tomb-robbing village of Gurneh (Kurna), who denied being responsible even under torture, then after a family dispute finally led the authorities to the great cache of royal mummies at Deir el-Bahri in July 1881. The cache was moved to Cairo as soon as possible to keep it safe from robbers. He was elected member of the Académie des inscriptions et belles-lettres on 20 November 1883. In 1886, he resumed work begun by Mariette to uncover the Sphinx, removing more than 65 feet (20 m) of sand and seeking tombs below it. He also introduced admission charges for Egyptian sites to the increasing number of tourists to pay for their upkeep and maintenance.

Maspero was popular with museum keepers and collectors because he was known to be a "pragmatic" director of the Service of Antiquities, one who would allow them to remove from the country what he did not want for the Bulak Museum in Cairo. Maspero did not attempt to halt all collecting, but rather sought to control what went out of the country and to gain the confidence of those who were regular collectors. When Maspero left his position in 1886 and was replaced by a series of other directors who attempted to halt the trade in antiquities, his absence was much lamented. Maspero resumed his professorial duties in Paris teaching at the Collège de France and the École des Hautes Etudes from June 1886 until 1899, when, at 53, he returned to Egypt in his old capacity as director-general of the department of antiquities and remained there until his retirement in 1914.

On 3 October 1899, an earthquake at Karnak collapsed 11 columns and left the main hall in ruins. Maspero had already made some repairs and clearances there (continued in his absence by unofficial but authorized explorers of many nationalities) in his previous tenure of office, and now he set up a team of workmen under French Egyptologists and regularly visited to oversee its reconstruction work, opposing some Romantics who wished the ruins left as they were. In 1903 an alabaster pavement was found in the court of the 7th Pylon, and beneath it a shaft leading to a large hoard of almost 17,000 statues, with every part of the dig drawn, recorded and photographed.

On Maspero's arrival in 1899 he found the collections in the Bulak Museum enormously increased, and while working to expand them further he superintended their transfer from Gizeh to the new quarters at Qasr El Nil in 1902. The vast catalogue of the collections made rapid progress under Maspero's direction. Twenty-four volumes or sections were already published in 1909. This work and the increasing workload of the Antiquities Service led to an expansion of staff at the museum, including the 17-year-old Howard Carter. It was Maspero who recommended Carter to George Herbert, 5th Earl of Carnarvon in 1907, when the Earl approached him to seek advice for the use of an expert to head his planned archaeological expedition to the Valley of the Kings. In 1904, when the British decided to raise the Aswan Low Dam by seven metres, Maspero managed to raise the necessary funds to isolate, consolidate, but also study a large number of religious buildings in Lower Nubia, which were threatened with engulfment.

Maspero also set up a network of local museums throughout Egypt, including a new larger Cairo facility, to encourage the Egyptians to take greater responsibility for the maintenance of their own heritage by increasing public awareness of it. In 1912 he also succeeded where his predecessors had failed in the introduction of a series of anti-looting laws.

Because of the long hours that he worked his eye-sight began to decline and so in the spring of 1914 he resigned his post in the hope of enjoying some remaining years to be devoted to his favourite studies, and to the congenial duties of Secretaire Perpetuel of the Academie des Inscriptions et Belle-Lettres.

Following his return to France Maspero was elected perpetual secretary of the Académie des Inscriptions et Belles-Lettres on 24 July 1914. Following his retirement he had a heart attack, from which he never fully recovered and while attending a session of the Académie on 30 June 1916, he fell ill and died on his bench. He was interred in the Cimetière du Montparnasse in Paris.

== Personal life ==
Maspero married the journalist Harriett Yapp, known as Ettie, on 11 November 11, 1871. The couple had two children: Georges (a future sinologist) and Isabelle who was born on 20 September 1873. A few days after the birth of her daughter Harriett died of peritonitis at the age of 27.

At the end of October 1880, the 34-year-old Maspero married 22-year-old Louise Balluet d'Estournelles de Constant de Rebecque (1856-1953), great-niece of Benjamin Constant and sister of Paul d'Estournelles de Constant. The couple had two children: Henri Maspero (who became a sinologist), and Jean Maspero (who became a papyrologist).

== Honours ==
Maspero was Commander of the Legion of Honour and received an honorary degree from the University of Oxford. He was made an honorary Commander of the Order of St Michael and St George (United Kingdom) in 1909. He was a member of Queen's College (University of Oxford), American Archaeological Institute (Boston), American Academy of Arts and Sciences (Cambridge, Massachusetts), American Philosophical Society (Philadelphia), American Oriental Society (Ann Arbor) and the Turin Academy of Sciences. On 30 November 1883, he was elected a member of the Académie des Inscriptions et Belles-Lettres.

== Works ==
Among his best-known publications are the large Histoire ancienne des peuples de l'Orient classique (3 vols., Paris, 1895–1897, translated into English by M. L. McClure for the S.P.C.K.), displaying the history of the whole of the nearer East from the beginnings to the conquest by Alexander; a smaller Histoire des peuples de l'Orient, 1 vol., of the same scope, which passed through six editions from 1875 to 1904; Etudes de mythologie et d'archéologie égyptiennes (Paris, 1893, etc.), a collection of reviews and essays originally published in various journals, and especially important as contributions to the study of Ancient Egyptian religion; L'Archéologie égyptienne (1887), of which several editions have been published in English. Maspero also wrote: Les inscriptions des pyramides de Saqqarah (Paris, 1894); Les momies royales de Deir el-Bahari (Paris, 1889); Les contes populaires de l'Egypte ancienne (3rd ed., Paris, 1906); and Causeries d'Egypte (1907), translated by Elizabeth Lee as New Light on Ancient Egypt (1908).

In 1878 he established the journal Recueil de travaux relatifs à la philologie et à l'archéologie égyptiennes et assyriennes. Published quarterly, it was the first French journal to act as a medium for publishing the results of detailed studies bearing on Egyptology and Assyriology. Maspero was not only its editor but its main contributor during the nearly 40 years of its existence.

He also established the Bibliothèque égyptologique in which the scattered essays of the French Egyptologists are collected, with biographies, etc.; and the Annales du service des antiquités de l'Egypte, a repository for reports on official excavations, etc.

In 1888, he published the first edition of the Arabic–Old French glossary.

Some public domain e-books by Maspero:

- Art in Egypt (1912).
- The Dawn of Civilization: Egypt and Chaldæa (1894).
- Egyptian archæology (1892).
- Guide to the Cairo Museum (1905)
- Life in Ancient Egypt and Assyria. (1892).
- The Passing of the Empires: 850 B.C. to 330 B.C. (1900).
- Popular Stories of Ancient Egypt (1915)
- The Struggle of the Nations: Egypt, Syria and Assyria (1897).
- History of Egypt, Chaldæa, Syria, Babylonia, and Assyria. (1903–04). 12 volume English translation of Histoire ancienne des peuples de l'Orient classique.

== Legacy ==
The Egyptian Radio and Television Union (ERTU) building in Cairo, Egypt was named after Maspero in recognition of his significant contributions to the study and preservation of ancient Egyptian monuments. Additionally, a nearby station on Cairo Metro Line 3 in Central Cairo was also named in his honour.

Maspero's influence extended into popular culture as well; the Egyptian director Shadi Abdel Salam featured him in the acclaimed film The Mummy.

== See also ==
- List of Egyptologists
- Maspero television building
- Georges Maspero (1872–1942), French sinologist, son of Gaston, brother of Henri and Jean
- Henri Maspero (1882–1945), French sinologist, son of Gaston, father of François
- Jean Maspero (1885–1915), French papyrologist, son of Gaston, brother of Henri and Georges
- François Maspero (1932–2015), French author and journalist, son of Henri

Preceded by Emmanuel de Rougé	Chair of Egyptian; Philology and Archeology at the Collège de France; 1874–1916	Succeeded by Alexandre Moret
