= Aden Arabie =

1931 book by Paul Nizan

- Author: Paul Nizan
- Original title: Aden Arabie
- Translator: Joan Pinkham (1968)
- Language: French
- Genre: Travel literature, pamphlet
- Publisher: Éditions Rieder
- Publication date: January 1931
- Publication place: France
- English publication date: 1968
- Media type: Print

Aden Arabie is a book by the French philosopher and writer Paul Nizan, published in 1931. It draws on the months Nizan spent as a private tutor in the British-controlled port of Aden in 1926-27, and combines autobiographical travel writing with a polemical attack on the French bourgeoisie, its philosophy and its culture.

The book is best remembered for its opening sentence: "I was twenty. I will not let anyone say that it is the best time of life." (Note: French original: "J'avais vingt ans. Je ne laisserai personne dire que c'est le plus bel âge de la vie.")

The book made Nizan's name in Parisian literary circles. He left the French Communist Party in 1939 and was killed in 1940, and the party's hostility to his memory weighed on his reputation for years. When François Maspero reissued Aden Arabie in 1960 with a long foreword by Jean-Paul Sartre, the edition marked the beginning of Nizan's literary and political rehabilitation in France. An English translation by Joan Pinkham appeared in 1968.

== Background ==
Nizan was born in 1905 and studied at the École normale supérieure in Paris. In 1926 he interrupted his studies and went to Aden as a tutor in the household of Antonin Besse, a French-born merchant based in the port. Sartre, who knew him from the École normale, read the departure as a last attempt at an individual solution to the discontent Nizan felt in France. Nizan stayed until the spring of 1927 and wrote regularly to Henriette Alphen, whom he married in December of that year. After his return he joined the Communist Party, and he remained a member for twelve years.

Extracts from the text ran in the review Europe in September and October 1930, and Éditions Rieder published the full book in January 1931.

== Content ==
The book does not fit a single genre. Its narrator leaves France hoping for a clean break, but finds in Aden the same social order he had fled, here in a harsher form under colonial rule. Nizan mocks the traditional promises of exotic travel, describes Aden as a concentrated and overheated version of Europe, and then turns his attention back to the society he came from. The book ends in an oath of hatred against the bourgeoisie, in which the author renounces any shame at being a fanatic. A passage often quoted from the text divides humanity into two kinds, bound to each other by nothing but hatred: "the one that crushes and the one that will not consent to be crushed". (Note: French original: "il n'existe que deux espèces humaines qui n'ont que la haine pour lien, celle qui écrase et celle qui ne consent pas à être écrasée.")

The historian Pascal Ory, Nizan's biographer, stressed the range of registers the short text covers. It contains a colourful travel narrative, a set-piece on objects of the kind found in Sartre's Nausea, a sketch of "Homo economicus" in the manner of La Bruyère, and a portrait of a character called "Monsieur C.", whom Ory identifies as Besse.

== Reception ==
On publication, several critics, including Emmanuel Berl and Gabriel Marcel, welcomed the arrival of a new writer, while the reviewer of Le Petit Parisien condemned the book as offensive and disagreeable in what it said about the French.

Sartre's foreword to the 1960 edition presents Nizan as a troublemaker who called for hatred and class war and left no room for compromise. The essay is about forty-six pages long in the English edition. In reviewing that edition for The New York Review of Books, Neal Ascherson described Aden Arabie as a crescendo of anti-bourgeois invective, "sometimes fine", rather than a travel book in any conventional sense. He found the text raw and self-indulgent, and Sartre's foreword not among his better essays. He added that the book had been recommended as a text for the European student rebels of 1968.

== Editions and adaptation ==
The first edition was published by Éditions Rieder in 1931. Maspero reissued it in 1960 in the series Cahiers libres, and later French editions have usually carried Sartre's foreword. The English translation by Joan Pinkham was published by Monthly Review Press in 1968, reissued by Beacon Press in 1970 and by Columbia University Press in 1987.

In 2008 the director Didier Bezace adapted the text for the stage at the Théâtre de la Commune in Aubervilliers, alternating extracts from Nizan's book with passages from Sartre's foreword. The production ran from 31 October to 30 November 2008, with Daniel Delabesse and Thierry Gibault in the cast.

== See also ==
- Paul Nizan
- Antonin Besse
