= Paul Nizan =

French philosopher and writer

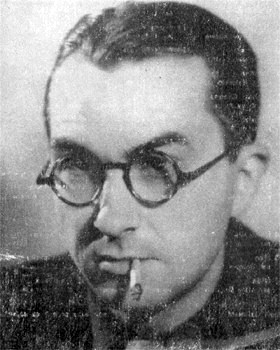
Paul Nizan

Paul-Yves Nizan (French: [nizɑ̃]; 7 February 1905 – 23 May 1940) was a French philosopher and writer.

He was born in Tours, Indre-et-Loire and studied in Paris where he befriended fellow student Jean-Paul Sartre at the Lycée Henri IV. He became a member of the French Communist Party, and much of his writing reflects his political beliefs, although he resigned from the party soon after the Molotov–Ribbentrop Pact in 1939. He died in the Battle of Dunkirk, fighting against the German army in World War II.

His works include the novels Antoine Bloye (1933), Le Cheval de Troie [The Trojan Horse] and La Conspiration [The Conspiracy] (1938), as well as the essays "Les Chiens de garde" ["The Watchdogs"] (1932) and "Aden Arabie" (1931), which introduced him to a new audience when it was republished in 1960 with a foreword by Sartre. In particular, the opening "I was twenty. I won't let anyone say those are the best years of your life" (J’avais vingt ans. Je ne laisserai personne dire que c’est le plus bel âge de la vie.) became one of the most influential slogans of student protest during May '68.

== Life ==
Nizan was born to a middle-class family, his father having worked in rail prior to World War I. Nizan's father's course through the bureaucracy of French industry would later form the basis of Antoine Bloye, and serve as a significant point of development for Nizan's understanding of social alienation.

Nizan was involved with Georges Valois's short-lived French fascist party Le Faisceau, whose popularity peaked in 1926. He interrupted his studies at the École Normale Supérieure of the University of Paris in 1926 to leave for Aden where he worked as tutor to the son of French-born businessman-millionaire Antonin Besse. He drew upon his six-month experience in Aden to write his first novella, Aden Arabie, published in 1931. Nizan then entered into a number of miscellaneous jobs around the French Communist Party (PCF), writing for its journal prominently and even, at one point, running a party bookshop in Paris. Nizan later took up a professorship teaching literature, during which time he took on a reputation among students as an affable and relaxed professor, sometimes even offering his students cigarettes during class. As a teacher, he was reticent about his own perspective on Marxist theory, instead encouraging his students to arrive independently at their own conclusions. Through this period, up to the onset of World War II, Nizan penned all of his major works, including "The Watchdogs", an exposé on materialist philosophy, and the novels Antoine Bloye and The Conspiracy.

In August 1939, he broke with the French Communist Party following the signing of the Molotov–Ribbentrop Pact. His motive was not a moral judgment against the USSR; on the contrary, he criticized the French Communist Party for having lacked cynicism:

Only events will confirm or invalidate me. But not arguments of the moral type. It was not because I thought the USSR's agreement with Berlin was "bad" that I took the resolution I took. It is precisely because I thought that the French Communists lacked the necessary political cynicism and the political power to lie that would have been necessary to derive the greatest benefits from a dangerous diplomatic operation. Why didn't they have the audacity of the Russians?

Given his active participation in the anti-fascist movement, as well as his commitment to the republican cause of the Spanish Civil War, Nizan could not accept the party's rapid shift against the Popular Front. Soon thereafter, Nizan enlisted to fight in the French army with the onset of World War II, and was killed in action on 23 May 1940 at the Château de Cocove in Recques-sur-Hem, during the German offensive against Dunkirk.

== Politics ==
Nizan's politics took a number of sporadic turns throughout the course of his life, with Sartre noting that Nizan in his youth had vacillated between fascist and communist sympathies, attracted to both extremes of the political spectrum. Nizan also approached the priesthood as a young man but soon turned away from that decision. Eventually, Nizan settled on membership in the French Communist Party, under whose auspices Nizan's public life as an author began. Within the party, Nizan wrote extensively for official communist publications and had his works sold in party bookstores, although his most celebrated work today is his fiction. In his various novels, Nizan explores modern alienation, as well as the situation of the radical petit-bourgeois milieu caught between contending class forces. While Nizan was a loyal adherent to the policies of the Communist Party, his writings anticipate elements of postwar radical existentialism, leaving the contemporary reader with an ambiguous image of Nizan's political standing.

== Works ==
- Aden Arabie (1931)
- Les Chiens de garde [The Watchdogs] (1932)
- Antoine Bloye (1933)
- Le Cheval de Troie [The Trojan Horse] (1938)
- La Conspiration [The Conspiracy] (1938)
- Morceaux choisis de Marx (1934) – Introduction by Henri Lefebvre
- Chronique de septembre (1939)
- Paul Nizan, intellectuel communiste. Articles et correspondance 1926-1940 (1967)
- Pour une nouvelle culture (1971)
- Articles littéraires et politiques, volume I (2005)

== See also ==
- Emmanuel Todd, his grandson
