= Khin Sok =

Khin Sok ឃឹន សុខ
- Born: 1942; Kandal, Cambodia, French Indochina
- Died: 10 October 2011 (aged 68–69); Paris, France

Academic work
- Era: ca. 1970 - 2011
- Institutions: Institut national des langues et civilisations orientales, Royal University of Phnom Penh
- Notable works: "Cambodian royal chronology (From Ponhea Yat to the fall of Longvek – between 1417 to 1595)." "The annexation of Cambodia by Vietnam during the 19th Century as retold in two poems composed by Venerable Botum Baramey Pich."

Khin Sok (Khmer: ឃឹន សុខ; 1942 - 10 October 2011) was a Cambodian historian, linguist, literature and arts scholar. He acquired a doctorate of history in Paris, published scientific works, taught as a professor in the Royal University of Phnom Penh and was a member of the Royal Academy of Cambodia. His publications during the second half of the 20th century profoundly contributed to the scientific interpretation of historical sources, literature and the systemic development of the modern Khmer language. As a participant of the Khmerization movement he encouraged the promotion of a culturally independent Cambodia on the basis of enlightened and scholarly education in an international context.

== Career ==
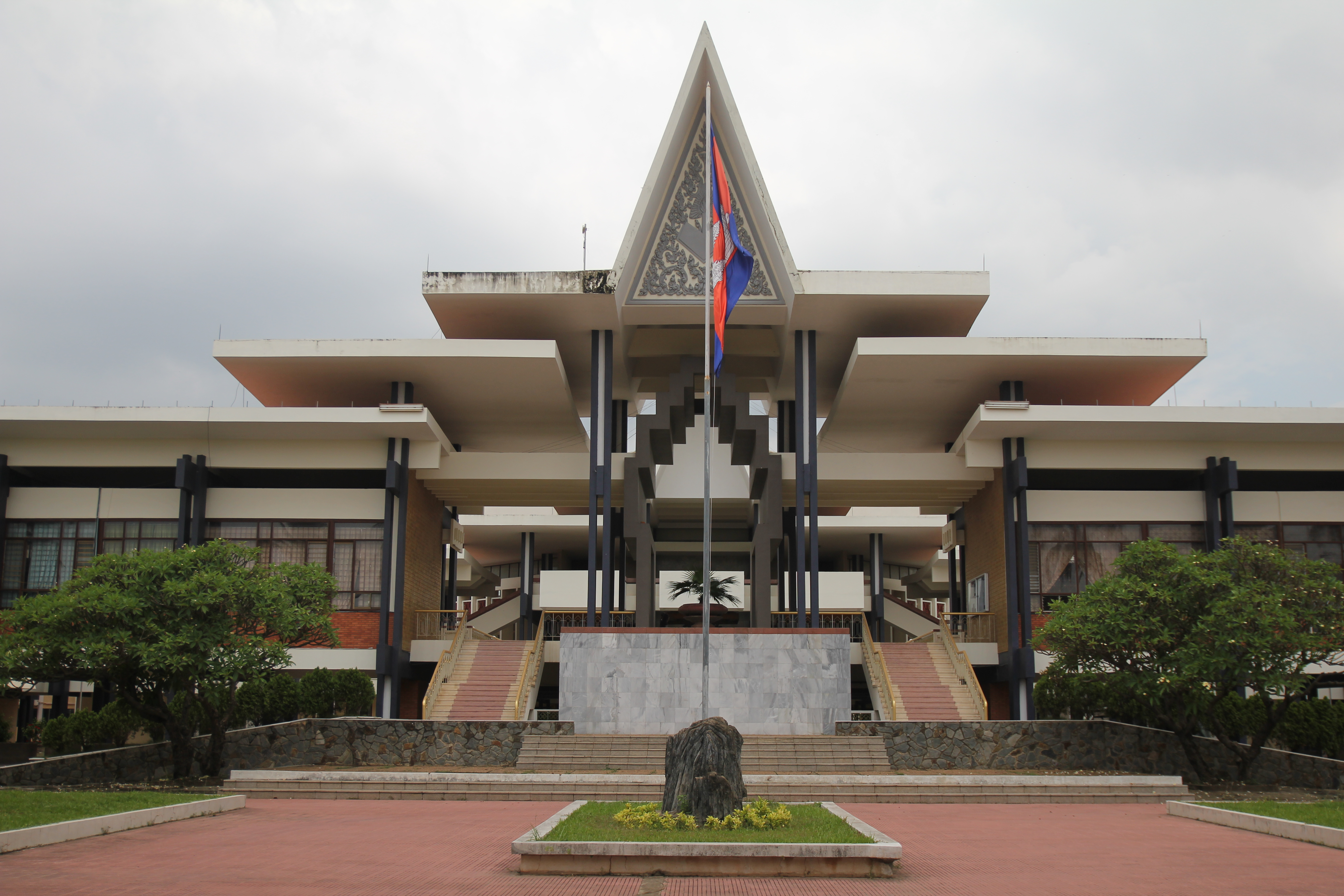
The Royal University of Phnom Penh (RUPP) is the national university of Cambodia.

After successfully acquiring certificates and titles in advanced literature and the arts, Khin Sok taught Khmer language between 1973 and 1993 at the Institut national des langues et civilisations orientales (INALCO) and published his early works (Mon-Khmer Studies, History Revisions) in Paris at the Bulletin de l’École française d'Extrême-Orient. From 1975 on he conducted studies, revisions, interpretations and translations of the Cambodian Royal Chronicles, culminating 1988 in his work "Chroniques royales du Cambodge (De Banà Yàt jusqu’à la prise de Lanvaek de 1417 à 1595). Traduction française avec comparaison des différences version et introduction" - a widely acclaimed revision and reinterpretation of previous works of European scholars. He and fellow scholar Mak Phoeun reassembled the individually treated, stylistically and methodically differing works of most of the French authors and rearranged them into a new context. During the 1970s and 1980s he published a number of works on the interpretation of inscriptions of various temple ruins of the Khmer Empire. His expertise helped to supplement and determine the actual Royal Chronology of Cambodia.

Beginning in the late 1980s, he produced a number of scientific papers on the history and the relations between Annam (modern day Vietnam), Siam (modern day Thailand) and pre-colonial Cambodia. In 1991 he published his synoptic works "Cambodia squeezed between Siam and Vietnam (from 1775 to 1860)" and "The annexation of Cambodia by Vietnam during the 19th Century, as retold in two poems composed by Venerable Botum Baramey Pich (The Kampoub Ter Ong story)".

During the 1990s Khin Sok's publications shifted towards linguistic topics, such as the first grammar book on modern Khmer language, a comprehensive Khmer language manual in co-operation with Claude Jacques and Yoshiaki Ishizawa and a contemporary Cambodian-French dictionary, followed by his concluding work: "La khmérisation de l’enseignement et l’indépendance culturelle au Cambodge - On the Khmérisation of education and the cultural independence of Cambodia." In later years he alternatively taught history and civilization of the countries of Southeast Asia in Phnom Penh and Paris in order to lend his expertise and presume the tradition of scholarly exchange and co-operation. Khin Sok was a prominent member of the "Association Culturelle Franco-Khmer", the "Association Des Etudiants Cambogiens" in France and the Cambodian Academic Network.

== Titles and diplomas ==
- BA in literature (Phnom Penh Faculty of Arts, 1967)
- Certificate of advanced Khmer literature studies (Phnom Penh, 1968)
- EPHE Diploma (4th Section, 1971)
- Doctorate in History (Paris VI University, 1975)
- PhD in Literature and Human Sciences (EHESS, 1987)
- University professor

== Occupations ==
- High school math teacher in Phnom Penh
- History professor at the Phnom Penh university
- Professor at the Institute of Oriental Languages and Civilizations from 1973 until his retirement (from assistant professor to lecturer).
- Member of the Cambodian Royal Academy.

== Publications ==
- Cambodian royal chronology (From Ponhea Yat to the fall of Longvek – between 1417 and 1595). French translation with a comparison of the various versions and introduction. Published by EFEO, Collection of texts and documents on Indochina, XIII, 1988, 471 pp.
- Cambodia squeezed between Siam and Vietnam (from 1775 to 1860). Published by the EFEO, Collection of texts and documents on Indochina, XVIII, 1991, 350 pp. incl. maps.
- Modern Khmer grammar, with an introduction by Claude Hagère (Prof. at Collège de France), Paris, You Feng Ed., 1999, 620 pp.
- The annexation of Cambodia by Vietnam during the 19th Century as retold in two poems composed by Venerable Botum Baramey Pich (The Kampoub Ter Ong story), Paris, You Feng Ed., 2002, 416 pp.
- Manual of Cambodian epigraphy, with the collaboration of Claude Jacques and Yoshiaki Ishizawa. Vol. I, Paris, EFEO/UNESCO and the Japanese Government, 2007, 215 pp.
- Cambodian grammar, Phnom Penh, Published by the Cambodian Royal Academy, 2007, 501 pp.
- Contributions to joint projects and magazine articles.

== See also ==
- École française d'Extrême-Orient
- Royal University of Phnom Penh
- Cambodian Royal Chronicles
- History of Cambodia
- Post-Angkor period
- Khmer language
- Literature of Cambodia

== Bibliography ==
- Khin, Sok (1988). Cambodian royal chronology (From Ponhea Yat to the fall of Longvek – between 1417 to 1595). French translation with a comparison of the various versions and introduction. Paris: EFEO.
- Khin, Sok (1999). La grammaire du khmer moderne. You Feng. ISBN 978-2842790868.
- Khin, Sok (2000). Khmer Manual. You Feng. ISBN 2842790685.
- Khin, Sok (2002). Modern Khmer Grammar. You Feng. ISBN 2842790863.
