= Georges Maspero =

- Born: 21 August 1872; Paris
- Died: 21 September 1942 (aged 70); Saint-Tropez
- Occupation: Sinologist

René Gaston Georges Maspero (21 August 1872 – 21 September 1942) was a French sinologist.

He was the son of egyptologist Gaston Maspero and half brother of sinologist Henri Maspero.

A colonial governor of French Indochina, he was appointed résident-mayor of Haiphong, then acting resident superior (15 April 1920 – 6 December 1920) of Cambodia. He subsequently chaired the restructured Banque Industrielle de Chine following its bankruptcy in 1921.

He was among the founders of the École française d'Extrême-Orient (EFEO).

== Publications ==
- 1894: Tableau chronologique des souverains de l'Annam, E. J. Brill
- 1905: Starynna istorii︠a︡ skhidnïkh narodiv, Volume 1, Nakl. Ukraïnsʹko-rusʹkoï vydavnychoï spilky
- 1915: Grammaire de la langue k̲hmère (cambodgien), Imprimetie Nationale
- 1918: La Chine, Delagrave
- 1928: Le Royaume de Champa, G. Van Oest,
- 1929: Un empire colonial français, l'Indochine, G. Van Oest.
