= Wat Kampong Tralach Krom =

Buddhist monastery in Cambodia

Coordinates: 11.9130°N 104.7775°E

- វត្តកំពង់ត្រឡាចក្រោម
- Location within Cambodia

Religion
- Affiliation: Theravada Buddhism

Location
- Location: Kampong Tralach district, Kampong Chhnang Province
- Country: Cambodia
- Interactive map of Wat Kampong Tralach Krom

Architecture
- Founder: Thiounn
- Completed: 1916

Wat Kampong Tralach Krom was a historic Buddhist temple located in the lower part of the district of Kampong Tralach in the Kingdom of Cambodia. Constructed in the early 20th century, the sanctuary was notable for its classical architecture and cultural significance until its demolition in 1967, when it was replaced by a modern structure.

== History ==
The construction of Wat Kampong Tralach Krom began in the summer of 1914. The temple was entirely funded and donated by Veang Thiounn, a prominent figure who served as the Minister of the Royal Palace and hailed from the village of Kampong Tralach Krom. The sanctuary was solemnly inaugurated in 1916, marking its importance to the local community and its benefactor. Veang Thiounn's contribution underscored the temple's role as both a religious and communal landmark.

In the first half of the 20th century, Wat Kampong Tralach Krom was an important center of the intellectual life of the Khmer Buddhist Sangha, and records of the Cambodian Royal Chronicles were written here. These along with other documents were published in 1969 by Eng Soth. It was the only chronicles he published that were actually written on palm-leaf manuscripts (sāstrā sleuk rith), rather than plain paper.

The temple stood for just over fifty years before its destruction in 1967, a mere two decades after Veang Thiounn's death. In its place, a modern building was erected, erasing the original structure from the landscape. In 1967, Wat Kampong Tralach Krom replaced the historic sanctuary with a modern structure. The reasons for its destruction are not fully detailed in surviving accounts, but the loss of the temple marked the end of an architectural and historical chapter for Kampong Tralach Krom. The timing—twenty years after Veang Thiounn's passing—suggests a shift in priorities or circumstances in the region during that period.

== Architecture ==
Wat Kampong Tralach Krom exemplified classical Cambodian temple design. Built with masonry, the sanctuary featured a reinforced concrete ceiling, a notable architectural choice for its time. The interior was adorned with high-quality mural paintings, which added to its aesthetic and cultural value. These artistic elements were documented in photographs taken by G. Nafilyan in 1966, preserving a visual record of the temple just a year before its demolition.

== Cultural Significance ==
Close the pagoda of Wat Kampong Tralach Leu hiver on the shore, the lower temple on the river of Wat Kampong Tralach Krom held considerable local importance due to its association with Veang Thiounn and its role as a gift to the community. The murals and classical design reflected the artistic traditions of early 20th-century Cambodia, making its loss a significant cultural event. They were comparable to the murals found at Silver Pagoda in Phnom Penh. The photographs taken by G. Nafilyan remain a vital link to its legacy, ensuring that its memory endures despite its physical absence.

== Legacy ==
Though the physical structure of Wat Kampong Tralach Krom no longer exists, its story survives through historical records and the photographs of G. Nafilyan. The temple remains a point of interest for those studying Cambodian heritage, early 20th-century architecture, and the contributions of influential figures like Veang Thiounn.
