= George Groslier =

French polymath

- Born: February 4, 1887; Phnom Penh, Cambodia
- Died: June 18, 1945 (aged 58); Phnom Penh, Cambodia
- Education: École nationale supérieure des Beaux-Arts
- Occupations: Painter; writer; historian; archeologist; ethnologist; architect; photographer; curator
- Spouse(s): Suzanne Poujade, 1893–1979
- Children: Nicole Groslier, born June 15, 1918 – died early 2015; Gilbert Groslier, born September 8, 1922; Bernard-Philippe Groslier, born May 10, 1926
- Writing career
- Language: French
- Years active: 1910–45
- Subjects: Cambodian dance, art, culture and history
- Notable works: Danseuses cambodgiennes anciennes et modernes; A l'ombre d'Angkor; notes et impressions sur les temples inconnus de l'ancien Cambodge

George Groslier (French: [ʒɔʁʒ ɡʁolje]; February 4, 1887 – June 18, 1945) was a French polymath who – through his work as a painter, writer, historian, archaeologist, ethnologist, architect, photographer and curator – studied, described, popularized and worked to preserve the arts, culture and history of the Khmer Empire of Cambodia. Born in Phnom Penh to a French civil servant – he was the first French child ever born in Cambodia – Groslier was taken by his mother to France at the age of two and grew up in Marseille. Aspiring to become a painter, he tried but failed to win the prestigious Prix de Rome. Shortly afterwards, he returned to Cambodia, on a mission from the Ministry of Education. There he met and befriended a number of French scholars of traditional Cambodian culture. Under their influence, he wrote and published, in France in 1913, his initial book on this subject: Danseuses Cambodgiennes – Anciennes et Modernes (Cambodian Dancers – Ancient and Modern). It was the very first scholarly work ever published in any language on Cambodian dance. He then returned to Cambodia, traveling the length and breadth of the country to examine its ancient monuments and architecture. From this experience came his book A l'ombre d 'Angkor; notes et impressions sur les temples inconnus de l'ancien Cambodge (In the Shadow of Angkor: Notes and Impressions on the Unknown Temples of Ancient Cambodia). In June 1914, Groslier enlisted in the French army and was employed as a balloonist in the early part of World War I. It was during this time that he met and married sportswoman Suzanne Cecile Poujade; they eventually had three children.

He was ultimately reassigned to French Indochina because of his knowledge of the Khmer language. Upon his arrival in Phnom Penh in May 1917, he was charged with a new mission: to found a new Cambodian art museum and organize a school of Cambodian arts. From 1917 to his retirement in 1942, Groslier changed the focus of his work from that of merely describing Cambodian culture for a European audience to what he called a "rescue mission" to save the indigenous national art forms of Cambodia from destruction. His vision for the museum was to build collections from the full range of Cambodia's traditional works of art. At the art school, Groslier did not try to make the native culture adapt to that of the colonizing power; on the contrary, he insisted that the school be run by Cambodians for Cambodians and that no European influence be allowed. He was also intolerant of any attempts by Europeans to loot or damage native art. In 1923, the 22-year-old writer André Malraux, later to become world-famous, removed some bas-relief statues from a 10th Century temple, Banteay Srei, with the intention of selling them to an art museum. Although Malraux claimed that he was acting within the law, Groslier immediately had him arrested, scarring the former's reputation in Indochina. Groslier would later contemptuously refer to Malraux as "le petit voleur" ("the little thief").

Between 1920 and 1939, Groslier's family frequently traveled between France and Cambodia so that the three children could attend schools in France. In 1939, however, events leading up to the Second World War made such travel increasingly dangerous, and Suzanne was forced to remain in France with their two sons, while Nicole, their daughter, stayed with her father in Cambodia. When the Japanese military occupied Cambodia, because French colonies were then administered by the pro-Axis Vichy regime, violence was initially avoided. But in March 1945, as the Allies made further advances in Asia, the Japanese relieved French officials of their authority, rounded up all foreign nationals, and placed them under guard in concentration camps. Because of his known enthusiasm for shortwave radio, Groslier was suspected by the Japanese of being part of the anti-Japanese resistance. On June 18, 1945, in Phnom Penh, while imprisoned by the Kempeitai, Groslier died under torture. He was later officially recognized as Mort pour la France ("Died in the service of France").

All Groslier's major work was inspired by his profound love and respect for the Cambodian people and their culture. Referring to his numerous talents, literary scholar Henri Copin has written:

Through these disciplines of learning and art he roamed majestically, like that familiar Asiatic figure the elephant, all while exploring the past and absorbing the present of the country that witnessed his birth and, ultimately, his death. Drawing from this matchless wellspring of riches, he was able to convey, in writings both knowledgeable and sensitive, the ties and emotions that bound him to the land of the Khmer and its singular culture.

In addition to his extensive body of scholarly writings on the art, archaeology and history of the Khmer people of Cambodia, Groslier's books include detailed travelogues as well as works of fiction – such as the novel Retour à l'Argile (Return to Clay (1928)), which won Le prix de littérature colonial (Grand Prize of Colonial Literature) in 1929 – describing his impressions of, and interactions with, Cambodians. Both institutions he founded, the National Museum of Cambodia and the Royal University of Fine Arts, are still in operation today.

== Biography ==
=== Early life and education ===
In 1885, a French couple, civil servant Antoine-Georges Groslier and his wife Angélina (née Legrand), arrived in Cambodia to serve the French Protectorate. The Protectorate was established when King Norodom of Cambodia signed a treaty with France to protect his country from incursions by neighboring Siam (present-day Thailand) and Annam (present-day Vietnam). On February 4, 1887, a son, George Groslier, was born to the couple. In 1889, his mother became pregnant with a second child, but due to the primitive medical situation in Cambodia, she was forced to travel to Saigon for the delivery. She gave birth to a daughter, who immediately died, so Angélina decided to return to her family home in France to protect two-year-old George from the harsh climate and dangers of colonial life.

Groslier began his education in Marseille and discovered his talents for writing and painting. At the age of seven, he attended the Universal Exposition in Lyon, which featured exhibits on French Indochina, including Cambodia. He grew up with an awareness of and interest in the land in which he had been born, but no great desire to return there. In 1904, at the age of 17, George published his first book, a self-published poetry collection entitled La Chanson d'un Jeune (Song of a Youth). Beginning about 1905, Groslier attended the prestigious École nationale supérieure des Beaux-Arts, studying under classical painter Albert Maignan, who was then in his sixties. (Groslier would dedicate his first book about Cambodia to the older painter.) In 1908, Maignan supported Groslier in his bid to compete in the challenging Prix de Rome art competition. A victory in this contest would have essentially ensured a successful career, but despite advancing further in the competition than had been the case with many famous artists (e.g. Eugène Delacroix, Gustave Moreau, Édouard Manet and Edgar Degas), Groslier was eliminated at the final level, and the young painter took this as a crushing defeat. However, this setback turned out to be a fortunate one, as it created the opportunity for his future career in Cambodia.

=== First project in Cambodia (1910–12) ===
In 1910, the Ministry of Public Education, whose head, Albert Sarraut, the future Prime Minister of France, would become his lifelong mentor and friend, commissioned Groslier to carry out an educational assignment in Cambodia. Upon his return to his birthplace, Groslier was soon working with prominent leaders in the field of Khmer archaeology, including Jean Commaille, Henri Parmentier and Henri Marchal. By all accounts, he was awed by his first glimpse of the ancient temples of Angkor Wat. As one scholar has said, "This vision of the grand Angkorean past was the wellspring of his love for Cambodia and its culture." Through the Angkor Society for Conservation of the Ancient Monuments of Indochina, he also met the writers Charles Gravelle and Roland Meyer, whose interest in the sacred and royal art of Cambodian dance matched his own.

==== Cambodian Dancers ====
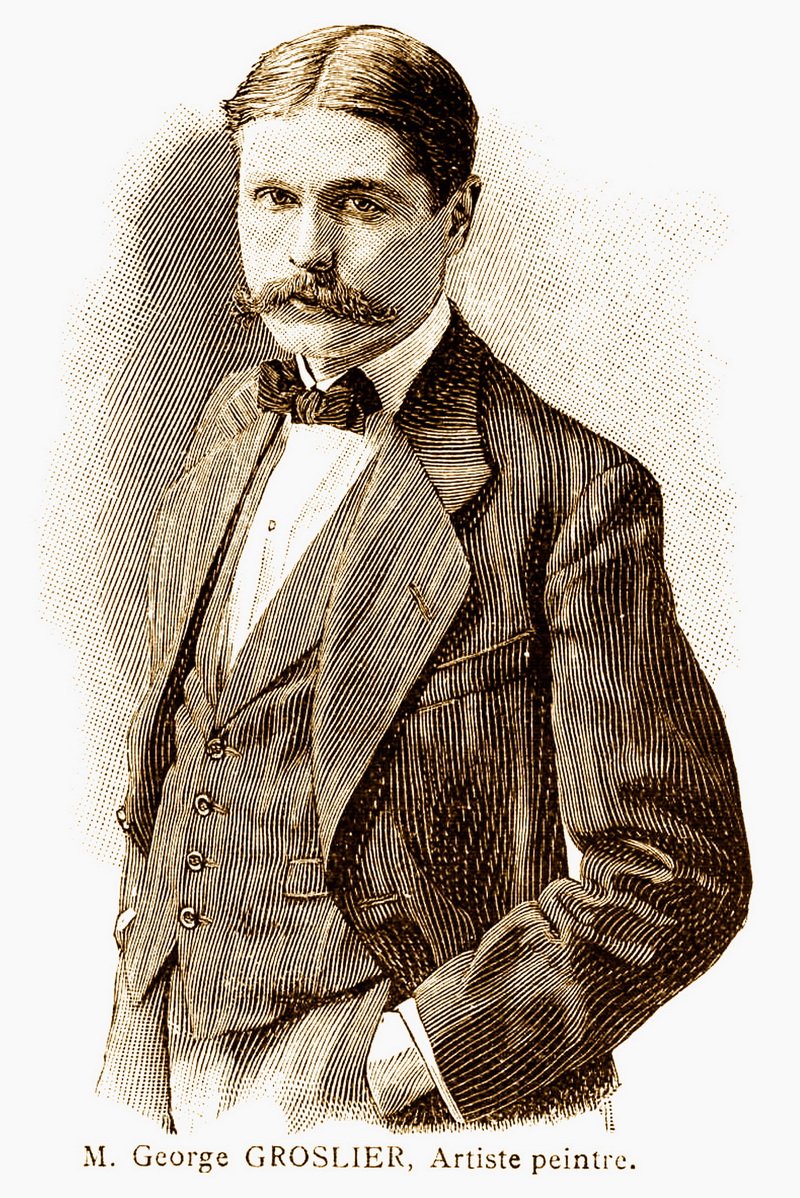
Portrait of George Groslier, from an advertisement for the wine Vin Mariani that appeared in the publication Femina (a French women's magazine issued from 1901 to 1954), shortly after the publication of his book on Cambodian dance

In addition to his administrative duties, Groslier initiated a scholarly study of Cambodia's unique traditional dance arts, the first that a European had ever undertaken. (Before Groslier, few French colonial scholars even mentioned dance in their analyses of Cambodian culture.) Although he witnessed just three evening performances for King Sisowath's birthday, and three additional "supplications" in the throne room, Groslier, with the special help of Gravelle, gained access to royal dancers and teachers connected to the king's court. He assembled hundreds of original sketches, numerous paintings and detailed written information, which he brought back with him to France.

Funded by a subscription from the Minister of Colonies and the "High Patronage of His Majesty Sisowath, King of Cambodia," Groslier published Danseuses Cambodgiennes – Anciennes et Modernes (Cambodian Dancers – Ancient and Modern) in Paris in 1913. Although the first edition totaled only 30 copies, this seminal work became, in one scholar's words, "the first commentary in any language – Asian or European – on one of the world's most refined performing arts whose roots stretch to antiquity." The book's value also lies in revealing performance practices for this art form that have since vanished. Groslier, for instance, noted in his book that wires were used to suspend some performers in mid-air during one of the performances he witnessed, which no longer occurs in Cambodian traditional dance performances today.

=== Second Project in Cambodia (1913–14) ===
Sarraut, the Minister of Public Education (and soon to be Governor General of Indochina), was so satisfied with Groslier's work that he issued him a new title: Chargé de Mission au Cambodge par le Ministère de l'Instruction publique et des Beaux-arts (Project Manager in Cambodia for the Minister of Public Education and Fine Arts). On April 1, 1913, George returned to Cambodia with new assignments.

Over the remainder of 1913, he traveled the length and breadth of the country documenting the most remote Khmer monuments and recording his impressions and adventures. Groslier traveled on his own, isolated in remote jungles, rivers and mountains in primitive and demanding conditions, assisted only by native helpers. Some of the Khmer temples he documented included Wat Phu, Preah Vihear (to which he had to hike 50 kilometers on foot), Beng Mealea, Lolei, Bakong and Banteay Chhmar, as well as temples of the Angkor group, including Ta Prohm.

==== In the Shadow of Angkor ====
He published his experiences in his second book, A l'ombre d 'Angkor; notes et impressions sur les temples inconnus de l'ancien Cambodge (In the Shadow of Angkor: Notes and Impressions on the Unknown Temples of Ancient Cambodia), penning lively accounts that blended his subjective impressions with objective details.

[The Khmer people]... resemble this forest. Like her, they are full of mystery. In their gestures, in their types, in their habits, in their implements, you sometimes discover a vestige of ancient times surviving to this day, mixed in with modern custom. You stumble upon it suddenly, as if in the depths of a forest. It might be a jewel, a humble bit of pottery, the shape of a statue's lip, a corrupted word of Sanskrit. The whole country holds vigil over its own sleeping past, deriving no profit from it, but unwilling to let it go.

As Maxime Prodromidès observes, what set George Groslier apart from other authors was his close contact with the Khmer people, with his passion split between the art and life of the country:

Is this a travel diary, a breviary of subjective archeology, an ethnological meditation? Mixed works do not lend themselves to classification. Too much science, cry the pure writers. Too much poetry, cry the scientists. Groslier fortunately indulged in both, never minding the contradiction.

Publication of the book was, however, delayed until 1916 due to the outbreak of the First World War.

=== World War I service ===
In June 1914, Groslier returned to France to enlist in the French army; the war began only weeks later. In 1915, Groslier was assigned to serve as a balloonist at Versailles Aerostation. Observation balloons were vital to the war effort as a means of aerial reconnaissance, and as these vehicles, for that reason, were favored targets for enemy fire, it was dangerous work. The French media at that time were encouraging French women to become pen pals with soldiers as a way of boosting morale. A relationship developed between Groslier and a pen pal named Suzanne Cecile Poujade, resulting in their marriage in Paris on May 27, 1916. (During this brief break from service, he arranged the publication of his second book on Cambodia.)

From there, Groslier returned to his unit, the Fifth Squadron, now stationed in Bar-le-Duc, about 60 km south of Verdun. The town was the railhead and key supply point for the Battle of Verdun, a horrific conflict that left 250,000 dead and 500,000 wounded between February and December 1916. Although she was not authorized to accompany him, Suzanne made her way to the town to join him, using documents issued under her maiden name to avoid detection.

In August 1916, Romania entered the war and Groslier was transferred to that front on an Air Force assignment in September, to work again under his mentor, Albert Sarraut, who was mission leader. On the long, circuitous trip, his ship was falsely reported sunk, causing great sorrow to everyone but his wife, who was certain he was alive. By the time he arrived safe and sound in Bucharest, he had been promoted to corporal. He spent the winter on the Eastern Front working as a courier. At about this time, the Russian Revolution began, and his wife noted somewhat nervously in her diary that "George bore some resemblance to Stalin." After completing his duties, George went to Liverpool and then to Paris to be reunited with his wife.

Albert Sarraut was then charged with assembling an Air Force team in the Far East and, knowing Groslier was familiar with Cambodia and was fluent in the Khmer language, Sarraut had him reassigned to this mission in April 1917. Groslier headed back to French Indochina, accompanied by Suzanne.

=== Professional life in Cambodia ===
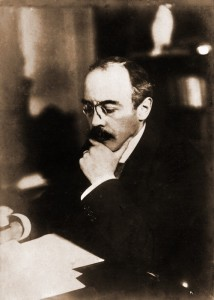
Groslier's mentor, Albert Sarraut, in 1917

Upon Groslier's arrival in Phnom Penh in May 1917, Sarraut, now Governor General of Indochina, terminated his military service. He charged him with two new missions: to found a museum of Cambodian art and to organize a school of Cambodian arts. Sarraut believed that the future of colonial rule lay not in assimilating cultures but, in his words, in "understanding [them] so that they may evolve, under our tutelage, in the framework of their civilization."

In the words of one scholar: "From 1917 to 1942, Groslier had shaped his career as a rescue mission and established institutions, principally an art school and museum, which he described as a life raft to save Cambodia's national arts from vanishing... Those arts he had only years ago described as 'immortal' now seemed to Groslier to be on the verge of vanishing." (From this point to the end of his life, Groslier continually resided in Cambodia, returning to Europe only for brief vacations or for educational initiatives on behalf of his professional mission, e.g., the 1931 Paris International Exposition (see below).)

Groslier proved brilliant at the public relations challenge of rallying French colonial public opinion (and the administration) to the cause of saving Cambodian art. He portrayed Cambodian culture as being as venerable and exalted as French culture and bemoaned the fact that "everything here that has withstood time, wars, and religions has now succumbed to civilization... Our steamships and automobiles generate a smoke in which champa flowers wither..." In the summer of 1917, Groslier initiated a national survey to quantify the state of traditional arts, and produced a report that predictably painted a very pessimistic picture of its present condition.

==== Founding of the Museum of Cambodia ====
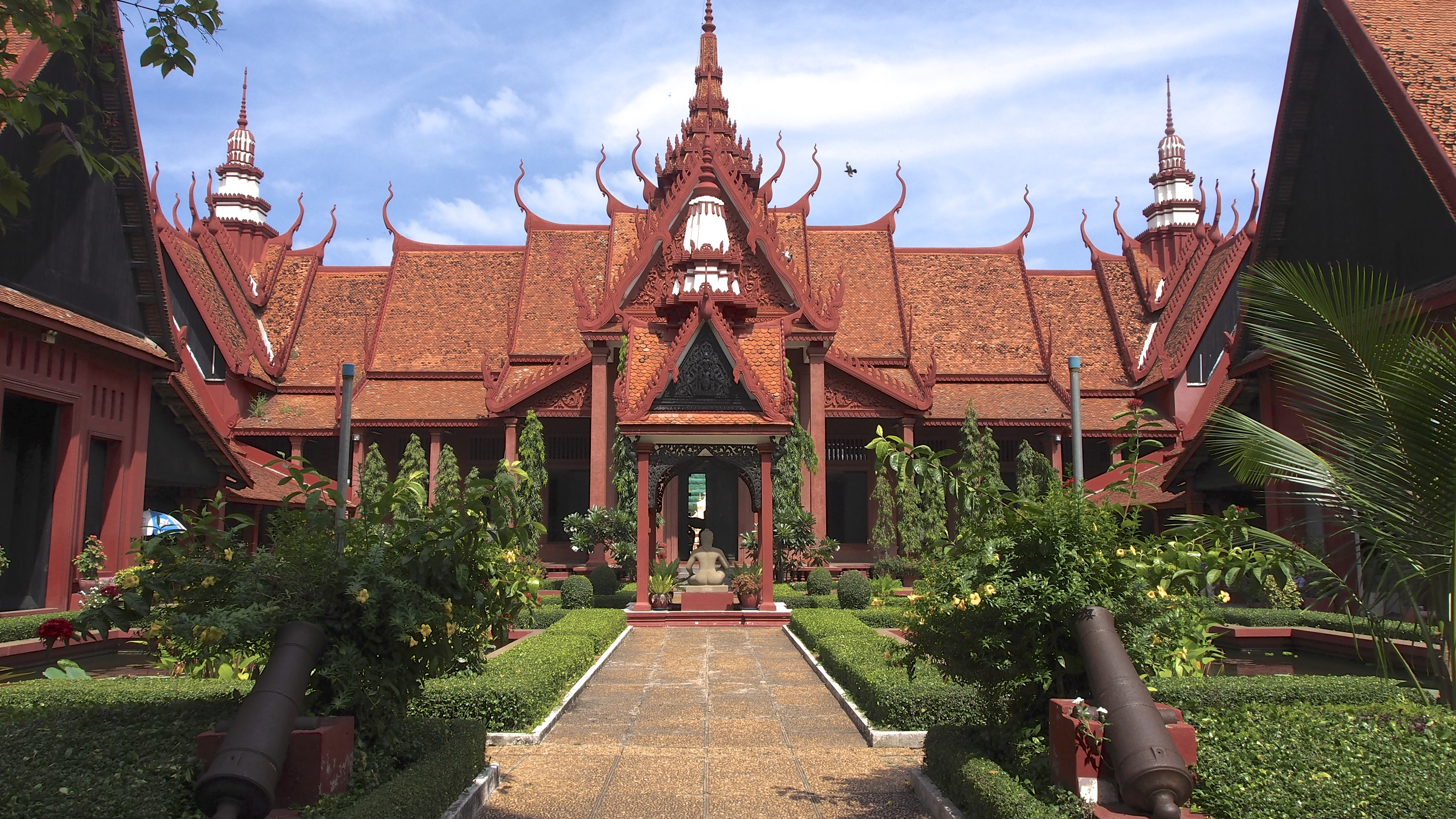
The National Museum of Cambodia (2013)

Groslier drafted the architectural plans for the Museum of Cambodia (Musée du Cambodge), known from 1920 as the Albert Sarraut Museum, which opened its doors to the public during the Cambodia New Year on April 13, 1920. (It continues to operate today as the National Museum of Cambodia.) His vision, shared and supported by Sarraut and by his peers, was for the museum to build traditional collections from the full range of Cambodia's ancient works of art, including sculptures, bronzes, inscriptions, ceramics, jewelry, fragments of monuments, wooden objects, paintings and manuscripts. Simultaneously he enlisted Cambodians in preserving their own heritage by providing an organization to catalog the nation's historical resources "to give all Khmers a stake in that past."

==== Establishing the School of Cambodian Arts ====
As the museum preserved Cambodia's past, Groslier organized the School of Cambodian Arts (École des Arts Cambodgiens, now known as the Royal University of Fine Arts), next to the museum, to serve the future by training new generations of artists. Groslier's explicit goal was, as he expressed it, to "do nothing but Cambodian art in the Cambodian way." Within the school, George established a series of workshops or guilds based on the "six great arts of Cambodia" including jewelry, painting and temple planning, metal work and casting, sculpture, furniture making and carpentry and weaving.

Groslier went on to organize the guilds to produce and sell Cambodian art through a worldwide network, enabling artists to gain an income and self-sufficiency. He also encouraged them to produce reproductions of traditional Khmer masterpieces as a way of satisfying foreign tourists' hunger for souvenirs, and thus discourage the foreigners from stealing the original artworks of the country. This arts program, according to Copin, served the interests of the colonial power, France; however, "it also served the interests of Cambodia, spotlighting the kingdom as a unique entity within the landscape of Indochina, and fostering an assemblage of a national cultural heritage that is today fundamental to Khmer identity."

Though the two institutions were administered by Frenchmen (including of course, Groslier), he pursued his own agenda by transferring true control of both to Cambodians. In 1917, he installed the former royal architect Tep Nimit Mak as an administrator of the school, and later assembled, with great difficulty, Cambodian master artists to teach. As the institution grew, Groslier maintained his hands-off approach. As Ingrid Muan describes:

Despite his own training as a painter, Groslier would never teach at the school. "I am not Khmer," he declared, and the "fundamental principle" of the School was "only to make Cambodian art and only to have it be made by Cambodians."

The one restriction placed upon these "masters" was that they "purge all Western influence" from their teaching.... "We don't expand on the pedagogical methods of the [Cambodian] master," Groslier declared: "No change is to be brought to their habits, their working methods, or the materials they use."

The doctrine of the "impenetrable sphere" of pure "Cambodian art" is shown clearly by the absence of French personnel in official photos taken of the School and its students shortly after it was put under Groslier and his French colleagues.

In 1923, a visiting French journalist, François de Tessan, arrived at the school and came away with a very favorable impression of both the school and Groslier, who proudly described to de Tessan its dedicated masters and students:

"As you can see," [Groslier] told me, "we have settled in and are well equipped. But for two years, at its very beginnings, the School of Arts was functioning in a dark, nondescript warehouse a third the size of what was needed... Every night during the rainy season we had to remove every piece of silk from the looms, because of leaks in our worm-eaten roof. It was a tedious task for masters and students alike. We had recruited a handful of professors and artisans to get the classes going. Not one failed to show up. Not one quit their job. Not a one. In fact, these educators were so enthusiastic that they refused their vacations. Outside its walls, all of them promoted the school, recruited students and sought ancient and rare objects."

Groslier's approach was exactly the opposite of that of the founders of another Indochinese institution, the Hanoi-based School of Fine Arts of Indochina (École Supérieure des Beaux-Arts de l'Indochine), which sought to train Asian students in Western modes of art, rather than native styles.

==== André Malraux incident ====
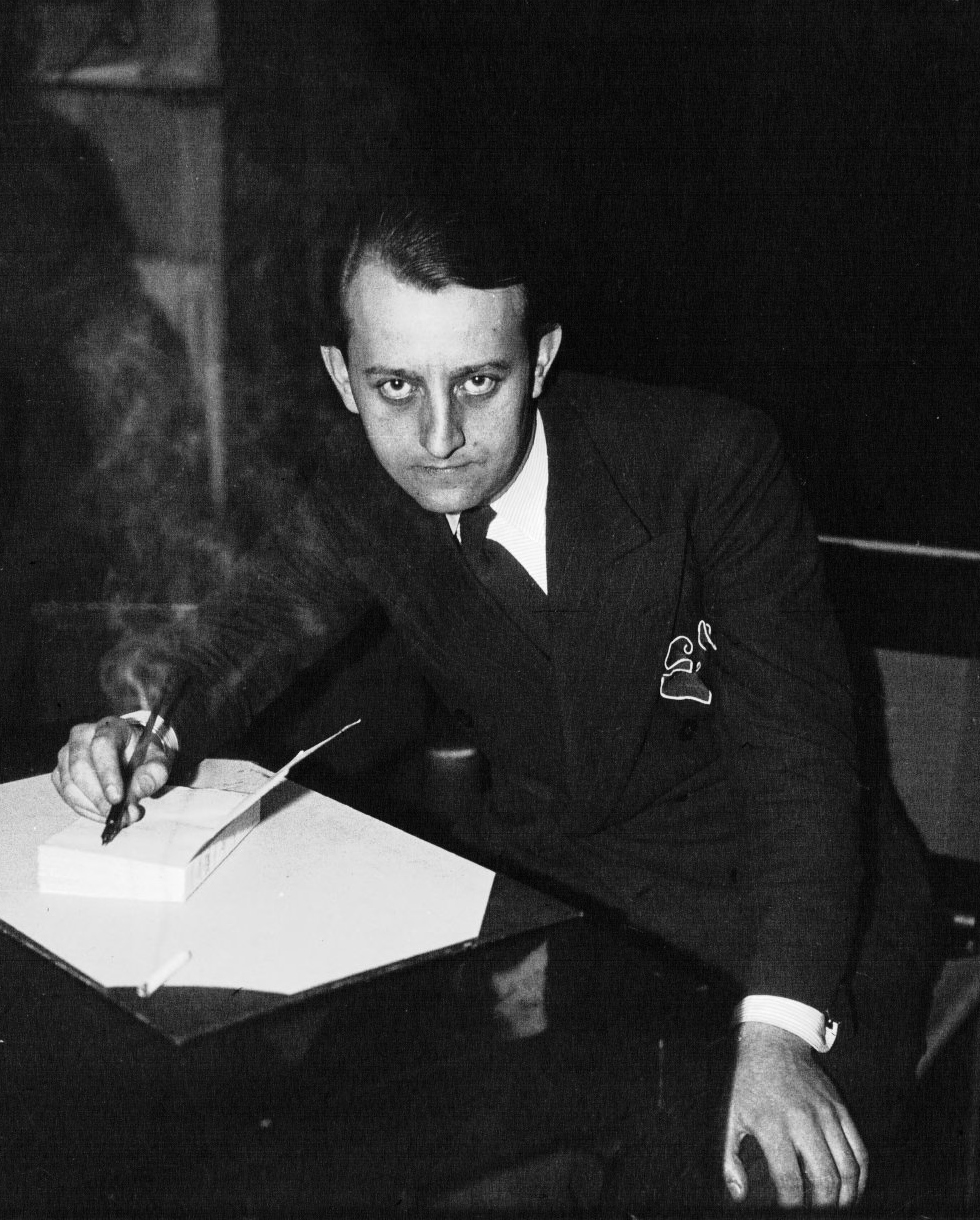
André Malraux in 1933, after establishing his reputation as a prominent left-wing writer, which had begun in the aftermath of the infamous "Banteay Srei" incident

In 1923, Groslier proved his commitment to preserving Cambodia's heritage when he organized the arrest of André Malraux, the future novelist and French Minister of Cultural Affairs. In France in 1919, when he was eighteen years old, the young Malraux had eagerly read an article by Groslier's friend, Parmentier, that appeared in an official publication by L'École française d'Extrême-Orient (EFEO), describing the impressive temple monuments of Cambodia, including those at a 10th Century temple, Banteay Srei (The Temple of Women). The article revealed the site as neglected and overgrown with vegetation. Apparently, Malraux, before he left France, made a detailed study of the applicable laws and determined (at least to his own satisfaction) that the site was abandoned property to which no one could stake legal claim.

In the summer of 1923, at the age of 22, he set out for Indochina with his wife, Clara, and a colleague, Louis Chevasson. The party concealed their true purpose – to take priceless traditional art objects and sell them to a European art museum – by pretending to be mere sightseeing tourists and scholars. Malraux had even received special permission from the authorities to explore the Banteay Srei site. However, upon meeting Groslier, Malraux inadvertently aroused the former's suspicions by referring repeatedly to the "commercial value" of the pieces in the Sarraut Museum.

On December 23, in his boat, the Hainan, Malraux arrived at Banteay Srei, seized four priceless statues depicting devata, which he divided into pieces and put into crates, and headed south, intending to ship his cargo to Thailand. Groslier, who had been tipped off, reached Kampong Chnang by car just as Malraux' boat arrived, went on board, identified the devata (in falsely-labeled crates), and arranged for the police to arrest the perpetrators as soon as they arrived at Phnom Penh that evening.

The incident created an enormous scandal in both colonial Indochina and France itself, despite the fact that Malraux was, at that time, virtually unknown outside French literary circles. As Copin puts it, "the controversial court cases that ensued shook the colonial administration from Indochina to Paris." In July of the following year, Malraux was sentenced to three years and Chevasson to 18 months in prison. However, there were many irregularities in the conduct of the case by the prosecution. It created a "secret dossier," withheld from the defense, with which it sought to demonize Malraux and Chevasson by their association with left-wing bohemians, whom it called "Bolsheviks," and by the fact of Clara's Jewish origins.

Furthermore, the basic legal case against Malraux was very questionable. It was true that the Governor General of Indochina had designated EFEO as the protector of Indochinese archeological sites and forbade anyone except members of EFEO from taking any artifacts out of the country. However, Banteay Srei had never been officially designated as a protected site. In the words of scholar Lindsay French, "Malraux, furious that EFEO should have such a monopoly over the temples, argued that since Banteay Srei had never been specifically 'classified' as a monument to be preserved, the stones were not legal artifacts and [therefore] there was no [legal] basis for his arrest."

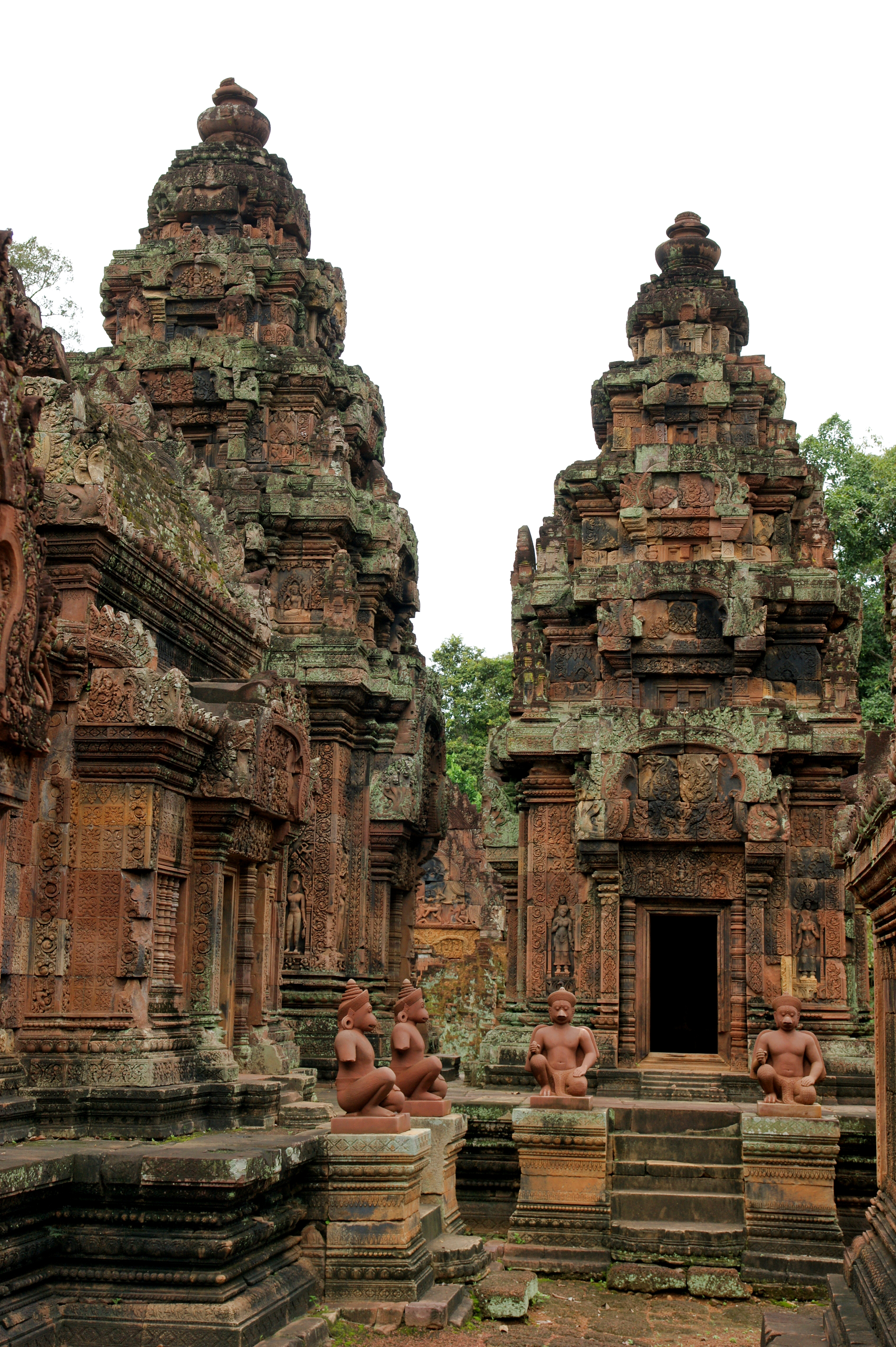
The temple of Banteay Srei in 2009

Over 50 prominent literary figures in France signed a petition for the release of the men. Both sentences were later reduced on appeal, and the men were eventually allowed to return to France without serving any jail time. Malraux depicted himself as the victim in the affair, as he sincerely believed that, in taking the statues, he had been acting within the law as it then existed. At least one commentator agrees that Malraux and his accomplice were treated harshly: "...if these two young men were to be imprisoned for taking the sculpture from Banteay Srei, should not the same penalty be exacted from the various Governors, High Commissioners, and administrators of Indochina who had done the very same thing to similar monuments?"

The incident had two repercussions. It prompted the colonial administration to belatedly begin a serious restoration of the decrepit Banteay Srei site, headed by Groslier's friend Parmentier, whose earlier article had brought the site to Malraux' attention in the first place. And Malraux, because he perceived himself to be the victim of what he regarded as corrupt colonial forces, began to champion the cause of the Indochinese people against the French colonists, establishing the previously apolitical artist as a serious left-wing author. One scholar defines the Banteay Srei incident and its aftermath as "how Malraux became Malraux." In 1930, he incorporated aspects of the incident into a novel about two looters journeying through the Cambodian jungle in search of treasure, titled La Voie royale. (In 1935, the book appeared in English as The Royal Way.) Although Groslier's daughter recalls that her father privately referred to Malraux as le petit voleur ("the little thief"), he never otherwise spoke of the incident, perhaps agreeing that Malraux, though guilty of stealing, had been treated unfairly by the court.

==== Scholarly and literary work ====
Groslier was a very prolific writer throughout his career, but the period between the mid-1920s through the early-1930s was particularly productive for him. In the second half of 1924, he published Angkor, and in 1925, he published two books: La Sculpture khmère ancienne (Ancient Khmer Sculpture) and a massive two-volume work, Arts et Archéologie Khmers (Khmer Arts and Archeology).

On September 17, 1929, his wife and children set out on a voyage to a home that the family owned in France, where they would remain for three years. Four days later, Groslier began a solitary journey from Phnom Penh via the Mekong River, ostensibly to inspect pagodas along his route, but actually to record, for a literary work, his impressions of the river, its wildlife and the people along its banks. (He made a second, similar journey in early 1930.) The result was the book Eaux et lumières; journal de route sur le Mékong cambodgien (Waters and Lights: Journal of a Voyage on the Cambodian Mekong), published in 1931. Copin offers a highly laudatory description of the book's approach:

In these pages the reader journeys alongside a double character, split between the learned archeologist, carrying out a government mission, and the adoptive son of Cambodia, by turns critical and empathetic as he sizes up the creatures he meets: river fishermen, peasants, bonzes, old women who will not be sweet-talked by this European who speaks their tongue and behaves for all the world like a native son of the land. We proceed from discovery to discovery, from temple and ruin to the minutia of daily life, from the droll to the picturesque, and see it all through the eyes of a deeply cultured man, there to illuminate every encounter. Could one hope for a more captivating or wonderful guide?

It was also during this period that he added another title to his long list of accomplishments: novelist. In 1926, he published his first novel, La Route du plus fort (The Road of the Strongest), an overview of colonialism more critical than he could ever have made in his scholarly works. Two years later, he published his most acclaimed work of fiction Le Retour à l'argile (Return to Clay). In his earlier book, In the Shadow of Angkor, he had indicated that he had no desire to write about Phnom Penh, as it was of little interest to him in comparison with the country's ancient temples. But by the time he wrote this novel, his attitude had changed radically. In this story about a French engineer who takes a Cambodian mistress, he sympathetically describes native urban life, contrasting it favorably with the world of Grolier's fellow Western colonists.

Many races had slowly wrought this people over the centuries. The Chinese had lightened the complexion, and the Siamese [i.e., Thais] and the Annamites [i.e., Vietnamese] had refined its forms, after the Aryan, perhaps, had widened its eyes. And thus the country abounded, end to end, with lovely girls, robust and complex, generated through these successive grafts, ripened in the heat, their nudity polished in childhood by the air and the waters... One would see no gesture, pose or movement that was not essential and harmonious with the surroundings — each so immediate, so supple, so deft, so spare, drawing on the atmosphere for buoyancy, and on nothing but ambient light for finery. To those with open eyes, this living beauty is all the more engrossing for its presence in all places and at all times.

The book received the Grand Prize of Colonial Literature (Le prix de littérature coloniale) in 1929, but afterwards fell into obscurity, until its re-release in modern French and English editions.

==== 1931 International Exposition in Paris ====
Groslier played a major role in preparing the Cambodian exhibitions for the Colonial Exposition that opened in Vincennes, just outside Paris, on May 6, 1931. The event was designed to be the most spectacular colonial show in history. However, it occurred at a time when the entire concept of colonialism — what the French called their mission civilisatrice (civilizing mission) — was increasingly seen by many, in the words of Groslier's biographer, Kent Davis, "less as altruism and more as a quest for power and profit." Groslier, however, who saw the exposition as an opportunity to open world markets to Cambodian art, wanted the work of Cambodian artists to be the highlight of this expo.

The focal point of the exhibition was a full-sized reproduction of the top level of Angkor Wat, reconstructed in the center of Paris, as well as a Cambodian pavilion that was

planned by Groslier in collaboration with the architect of the Exposition and members of the Department of Public Works (whom Groslier claimed did nothing). Decorative details and the sculpted wood entrance of the building were completed by ateliers at the School of Cambodian Arts... The entire middle gallery of the exhibition space was reserved for "Arts cambodgiens."

Suzanne Groslier's notes confirm that preparations for the exhibition began a year in advance of the official opening, so that the Cambodian exhibition was ready before those of any of the other participants. Despite the ongoing worldwide Depression, the exposition, which attracted 33 million visitors, was a resounding success for Cambodian art. In fact, such a demand for indigenous Cambodian crafts was created that a permanent sales office for such items was opened in Paris.

=== Marriage and family life ===
Suzanne Poujade, Groslier's wife, was born in Paris in 1893. (By a strange coincidence, Albert Sarraut, Groslier's future mentor and employer, was a friend of the Poujade family.) She had been very thin as a child and a doctor had recommended sports as therapy. As a result, in her teens she trained in both ice skating and tennis and became a champion at both. With her skating partner, a man named Pigueron, she won five gold medals at the national championships and several medals at the Paris city championships. In tennis, she competed in the world championships in 1914, and won three gold medals.

At the outbreak of the war, Suzanne headed for Lavaur in southwest France, where some of her father's family lived and where she worked as a nurse for the war effort. It was while staying in the area, both to pass the time and to do something novel for their country, that she and some friends decided to participate in the marraine de guerre (War Godmother) program, in which civilian women established pen pal relationships with soldiers at the front. After Suzanne's friends had chosen their pen pals, Suzanne took a letter from balloonist George Groslier and began a correspondence with him. As noted above, Suzanne and George fell in love and were married in May 1916. This was not unusual: many pen pal relationships begun by the War Godmother program ended in marriage.

The couple had three children, all of whom were born in Cambodia like their father:

- Nicole, born June 15, 1918 (godfather: Albert Sarraut)
- Gilbert, born September 8, 1922
- Bernard-Philippe, born May 10, 1926.

The last child, Bernard-Philippe Groslier, would follow in his father's footsteps and become a renowned archaeologist and curator of the National Museum of Cambodia.

During the children's youth, they spent much time in France at the family home there and attending school. In June 1939, just before the outbreak of a new war, Suzanne traveled to France with young Bernard (Gilbert had already been in the country for several years as a high school student), while Nicole remained behind with her father. In June 1940, the Nazis invaded France, and Suzanne and her sons eventually took refuge in unoccupied (Vichy) southern France, whose administration still controlled the French colonies, including Cambodia. However, because of the war, sea travel between France and Southeast Asia was disrupted, and neither Suzanne, Gilbert, nor Bernard would ever see Groslier again.

=== Japanese occupation and death ===
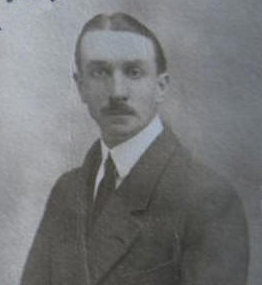
Jean Decoux, Governor-General of French Indochina from 1940 to 1945, photographed in 1919

In July 1940, the Vichy government appointed Admiral Jean Decoux as Governor-General of Indochina. On September 22, under heavy pressure from Germany, Decoux signed a treaty giving Japanese forces free movement through the area, effectively ending resistance against them. Although the Vichy regime continued to administer Indochina, the Japanese, which stationed a garrison of 8,000 troops in Cambodia, were the true masters of the region.

However, because France was officially, at that time, an ally of Japan, Cambodia temporarily avoided the violence and disorder that was tearing apart so much of the rest of the world, and the life of the French colonists, although more isolated from the outside world, went on more or less as before. It was during this period that Groslier, who was still in his fifties, retired. At this time, also, the Japanese became increasingly interested in Cambodian culture, particularly Angkor. A translation of Groslier's 1924 book on the subject, Angkor, was published by a Japanese press in Tokyo under the title Ankōru no iseki (Ruins of Angkor).

The political situation changed drastically in August 1944, when Paris was liberated by Allied forces. The Vichy government shortly afterwards collapsed. (Groslier's son, Bernard, participated actively in the French Resistance.) In Asia, too, the Allies were encroaching upon the increasingly desperate Japanese. On March 9, 1945, Japanese authorities, promising autonomy to the local population, overthrew the French colonial regime, and four days later King Sihanouk declared Cambodia's independence from France and its alliance with the crumbling Japanese Empire.

The Japanese proceeded to round up all foreign nationals in the country, including Groslier and his daughter, and place them in concentration camps. As Nicole Groslier describes it:

We were all herded to a concentration camp and forced to stay there, in that small camp. Men and women were separated. I did not see my father. I was alone. Many people in the camp became so ugly. Greedy. Mean. There were arguments over food, money and supplies. This bothered me so much.

Since at least the 1930s, Groslier had been a passionate shortwave radio enthusiast. (A photo dating from 1933 reveals his rather sophisticated system, and it may have become more elaborate in the intervening years.) This fact aroused the suspicions of the Japanese authorities, who feared that Groslier might be using his radio to help anti-occupation forces within the country. Nicole later insisted that her father used his radio solely to listen to music. However, Copin remarks that he "apparently supported local resistance efforts," and Davis concedes that this was at least possible, though not proven. Eyewitnesses in the camp report that the Japanese military police, the Kempeitai, interrogated Groslier, tortured him, and returned him to his cell dead or dying on the morning of June 18, 1945.

Nicole, who had not been notified of her father's fate, was called into the office of the camp commander. Without a word, the man gestured in the direction of a nearby table. On or near the table were her father's last remains: his eyeglasses, a pair of shoes and his ashes in a box. She retrieved the objects and left. "My God," she later wrote, "I was frightened and lonely that day." After Indochina was re-occupied by the French (with Bernard as part of this invading force), Groslier's ashes were sent to France, where they are now interred.

== Legacy ==
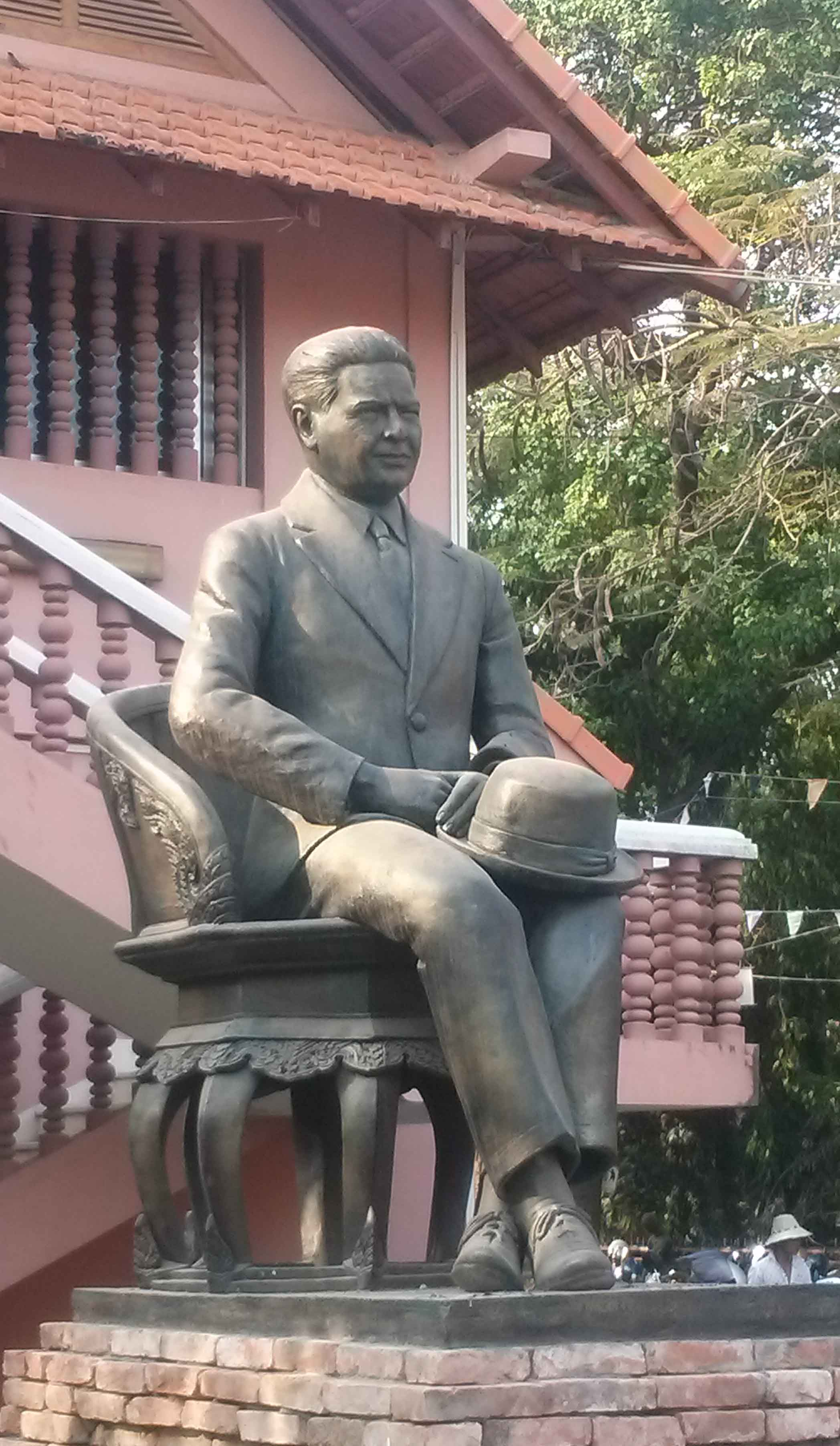
Statue of George Groslier at the Royal University of Fine Arts (formerly the School of Cambodian Arts) in Phnom Penh

On October 4, 1946, Governor Penn Nouth of Phnom Penh honored Groslier by inaugurating rue Groslier ("Groslier Street") in front of the National Museum, saying

If there is a Frenchman whom destiny seems purposely to have selected to become a link between Cambodia and France — one of those bonds of mind and heart that no one, whatever his politics, can permit himself to denounce — that Frenchman's name is George Groslier.

Historian Penny Edwards observes that, though there is no longer a rue Groslier, "the palace and the arts school still grace the skyline." However, in 2019 an initiative was started to rename this street in memory of Georges Groslier, with various expressions of support or objection.

On May 5, 1947, the French government officially recognized Groslier as "Mort pour la France," a term traditionally used for military personnel and civilians, killed during a period of French military conflict, who are considered to have died in service to their country.

In 2008, DatAsia Press editor Kent Davis began working with Nicole Groslier and her family, documenting her father's life, translating a number of his books to English, and restoring them to print, as listed in the bibliography below.

In October 2015, the Royal University of Fine Arts in Phnom Penh honored Groslier with a statue next to H. M. Sisowath on the school grounds.

== Awards and honors ==
During his lifetime, Groslier won many awards and honors from many different counties. Davis quotes historian Joel Montague as saying that Groslier was "a bit of an oddity" in that he won his awards not over a short span of time, but throughout his life, from his teens to his fifties, as well as in the fact that he was given them for widely divergent activities and services: for painting, for writing, for museum work, for charity, and from the governments of France, Cambodia, Laos and Annam (Vietnam). Davis points out yet another interesting fact: in the more than 100 surviving photos of Groslier, he never appears wearing any of his many decorations. The list of awards follows:

- 1905 – Orphelinat des Arts (Painting) – Médaille de Bronze
- 1905 – L'Enseignement Moderne (Io Prix de Diction de Paris) — Médaille de Bronze
- 1907 – Prix de Rome (Painting) – Second Grand Prize
- 1909 – L'Exposition artistique du Régiment du Génie (Painting) – Médaille de Bronze
- 1911–1914 – L'Ordre Royal du Cambodge (H. M. King Sisowath) – Chevalier
- 1911–1914 – Ordre Royal du Munisaraphon
- 1911–1914 – Médaille d'Or du Roi (Cambodia, H. M. King Sisowath)
- 1911–1914 – Ordre du Million d'Éléphants et du Parasol blanc (Laos, H. M. King Sisavang Vong) – Chevalier
- 1912 – Ordre du Khim-Khanh (Annam) – Chevalier
- 1913 – La Société de Géographie Commercial (Section d'Angers) – Médaille de vermeil
- 1925 – La Société de Géographie de Paris – Médaille Dupleix
- 1926 – Ordre national de la Légion d'honneur – Chevalier
- 1929 – Le prix de littérature coloniale – Retour à l'Argile (Return to Clay)
- 1931 – L'Exposition Coloniale de Paris – Diplôma d'Honneur
- 1931 – L'Exposition Coloniale de Paris – Médaille de vermeil
- 1932 – L'Académie des Sciences Coloniales de Paris – Médaille de Bronze
- 1934 – Officier de l'Etoile d'Anjouan (Comores)
- 1939 – Mérite Social – Chevalier
- 1939 – Dragon d'Annam – Officier
- 1943–1944 – L'Ordre Royal du Cambodge (H. M. Norodom Sihanouk) – Commandeur

== Works ==
The following is a list of published work by George Groslier in French and English.

=== Nonfiction books ===
- La Chanson d'un Jeune. Self-published, 1904.
- Danseuses cambodgiennes – anciennes et modernes. Paris : A. Challamel, 1913.
- A l'ombre d'Angkor; notes et impressions sur les temples inconnus de l'ancien Cambodge. Paris : A. Challamel, 1913.
- Recherches sur les Cambodgiens d 'après les textes et les monuments depuis les premiers siècles de notre ère. Paris : A. Challamel, 1921.
- Arts et Archéologie khmères. 2 vol. Paris : A. Challamel, 1921–1926.
- Angkor...Ouvrage orné de 103 gravures et de 5 cartes et plans. Paris: H. Laurens, 1924.
- Arts et Archéologie Khmers. Revue des Recherches sur les Art, les Monuments et l 'Ethnographie du Cambodge, depuis les Origines jusqu'à nos Jours. Paris: Société d'Editions Géographiques, Maritimes et Coloniales, 1925.
- La sculpture Khmère ancienne; illustrée de 175 reproductions hors texte en similigravure. Paris : G. Crès, 1925.
- Les collections khmères du Musée Albert Sarraut à Phnom-Penh. Paris: G. van Oest, 1931.
- Eaux et lumières; journal de route sur le Mékong cambodgien. Paris: Société d'éditions géographiques, maritimes et coloniales, 1931.
- L'enseignement et la mise en pratique des arts indigènes au Cambodge (1918–1930). Paris: Sté d'éditions géographiques, maritimes et coloniales, 1931.
- Angkor, with 103 illustrations, 5 maps and plans. Translated from the French by Paule Fercoq Du Leslay. Evreux: impr. Hérissey, 1933.
- Ankōru iseki (Japanese translation of Angkor). Tokyo: Shinkigensha, 1943.

=== Novels ===
- La Route du plus fort. Paris, Emile-Paul frères, 1926.
- Le Retour à l'argile. Paris : Emile-Paul frères, 1928.
- Monsieur De La Garde, Roi: Roman, Inspiré Des Chroniques Royales Du Cambodge. Paris: L'Illustration, 1934.
- Les Donneurs de Sang, Phnom Penh et Saigon. Saigon : Albert Portail, 1941.
- Le Christ Byzentine. Ellery Queen Mystère Magazine, N°69 and N°70, 1953.

=== Graphic work ===
- Les Ruines d 'Angkor. Indochine, 1911.

=== Miscellaneous French language publications ===
==== Archaeological publications (selected) ====
- "Objets anciens trouvés au Cambodge." Revue archéologique, 1916, 5e Série, vol. 4, pp. 129-139.
- "Objets cultuels en bronze dans l'ancien Cambodge." Arts et Archéologie khmers, 1921-3, vol. 1, fasc. 3, pp. 221-228.
- "Le temple de Phnom Chisor." Ibid, vol. 1, fasc. 1, pp. 65-81.
- "Le temple de Ta Prohm (Ba Ti)." Ibid, vol. 1. fasc. 2, pp. 139-148.
- "Le temple de Preah Vihear". Ibid, 1921–1922, vol. 1. fasc. 3, pp. 275-294.
- Angkor, Les Villes d 'Art célèbres. Paris, Laurens, 1924.
- "La fin d'Angkor." Extrême-Asie, Saigon, Sept. 1925.
- "Les collections khmères du Musée Albert Sarraut." Ars Asiatica, XVI, Paris, G. Van Oest, 1931.
- "Les Temples inconnus du Cambodge." Toute la terre, Paris, June 1931.
- "Les Monuments khmers sont-ils des tombeaux?" Bulletin de la Société des Eudes Indochinoises. Saigon, 1941, N.S., vol. 16. N°l pp. 121-126.

==== Publications on indigenous arts of Cambodia (selected) ====
- "L'agonie des Arts cambodgiens." Revue Indochinoise, Hanoï, 2e sem. 1918, p.207.
- "Question d'art indigène." Bulletin des Amis du Vieux-Hué, Hué, Oct.-Dec. 1920, pp. 444-452.
- "Étude sur la psychologie de l'artisan cambodgien." Arts et Archéologie khmers, 1921, vol. 1, fasc. 2, pp. 125-137.
- "Seconde étude sur la psychologie de l'artisan cambodgien." Arts et Archéologie khmers, 1921, vol. 1. fasc. 2, pp. 205-220.
- "La reprise des arts khmèrs." La Revue de Paris, Nov. 15, 1925. pp. 395-422.
- "Avec les danseuses royales du Cambodge." Mercure de France, May 1, 1928, pp. 536-565.
- "Le théâtre et la danse au Cambodge." Journal Asiatique, Paris, Jan.-Mar. 1929. vol. 214, pp. 125-143.
- "La Direction des Arts cambodgiens et l'École des Arts cambodgiens." Extrême-Asie, Saigon, March 1930, N° 45, pp. 119-127.
- "L'Orfèvrerie cambodgienne à l'Exposition Coloniale." La Perle, Paris, 1931.
- "Les Arts indigènes au Cambodge." 10th Congress of the Far-Eastern Association of Tropical Medicine, Hanoi, 1938, pp. 161-181.

=== Miscellaneous English language publications ===
- Angkor, Les Villes d'Art célèbres. Paris. Laurens, 1932 (English translation of 1924 French publication).
- "Royal Dancers of Cambodia." Asia, 1922, vol. 22, N° 1, pp. 47-55, 74-75.
- "The Oldest Living Monarch." Asia, 1923. vol. 23. pp. 587-589.
- "Contemporary Cambodian art studied in the Light of the Past Forms." Eastern Art, Boston, 1930. vol. 2, pp. 127-141.

=== Narratives ===
- "Propos sur la maison coloniale." Extrême-Asie, Saigon, 3° trim. 1926, pp. 2-10; March 1927, pp. 307-366.
- "Le Singe qui montre la Lanterne magique." Extrême-Asie, Saigon, Feb. 1928, pp. 347-366; mars 1928, pp. 435-450; avril 1928, pp. 499-505; mai 1928, pp. 546-554.
- "C'est une idylle..." Mercure de France, Paris, July 1929.
- La Mode masculine aux colonies. Paris : Adam, 1931.
- "Nos boys." Extrême-Asie, Saigon, August 1931, N° 55, pp. 69-76.

=== Modern Editions ===
==== French ====
- La Route du plus fort. Paris: Kailash, 1994. ISBN 978-2-909052-52-6
- Le Retour à l 'argile. Paris: Kailash, 1994. ISBN 978-2-909052-49-6

==== English ====
- Cambodian Dancers – Ancient & Modern. Holmes Beach, FL: DatAsia Press, 2010 ISBN 978-1-934431-12-2
- Cambodian Dancers – Ancient & Modern. Phnom Penh, Cambodia: DatAsia Press, 2011 ISBN 978-1-934431-03-0.
- In the Shadow of Angkor – Unknown Temples of Ancient Cambodia. Holmes Beach, FL: DatAsia Press, 2014. ISBN 978-1-934431-90-0
- Return to Clay – A Romance of Cambodia. Holmes Beach, FL: DatAsia Press, 2014. ISBN 978-1-934431-94-8
- Water and Light – A Travel Journal of the Cambodian Mekong. Holmes Beach, FL: DatAsia Press, 2016. ISBN 978-1-934431-87-0
- Road of the Strong – A Romance of Cambodia. Holmes Beach, FL: DatAsia Press, 2016. ISBN 978-1-934431-16-0

== See also ==
- List of French architects
- List of French-language authors
