= Wat Kampong Tralach Leu =

Buddhist monastery in Cambodia

Coordinates: 11.9230°N 104.7647°E

- វត្តកំពង់ត្រឡាចលើ
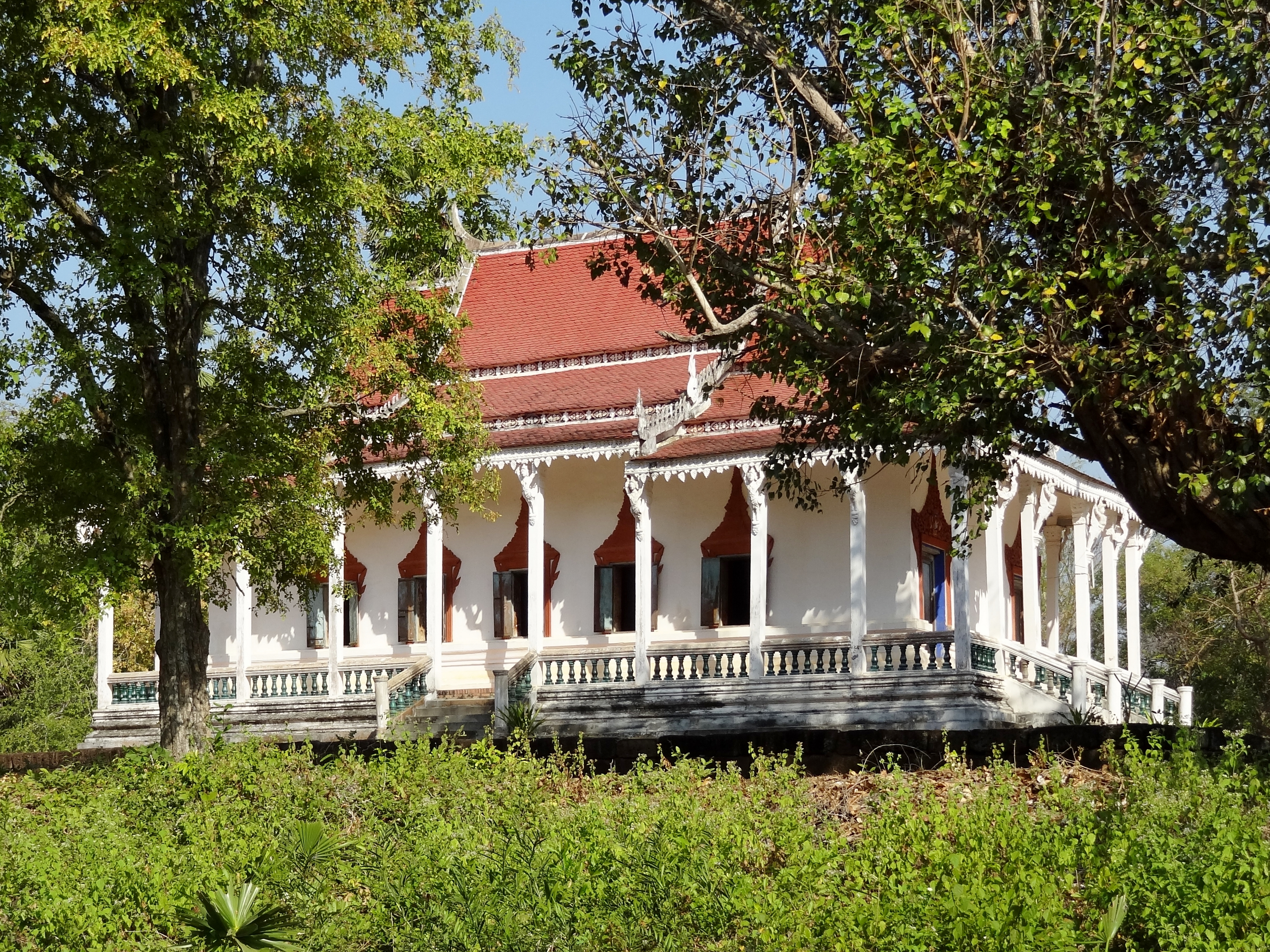

- Location within Cambodia

Religion
- Affiliation: Theravada Buddhism

Location
- Location: Kampong Tralach district, Kampong Chhnang Province
- Country: Cambodia
- Interactive map of Wat Kampong Tralach Leu

Architecture
- Founder: Tep Nimit Mak
- Completed: 1910's

Wat Puthi Rokha Ram, also known as Wat Kampong Tralach Leu, is a historic Buddhist temple located in the village of Kampong Tralach district, Kampong Chhnang Province, Cambodia. Renowned as one of the oldest pagodas in the province, the temple is celebrated for its deep historical roots and its culturally significant 17th-century murals, which reflect Cambodia’s rich artistic heritage.

== History ==
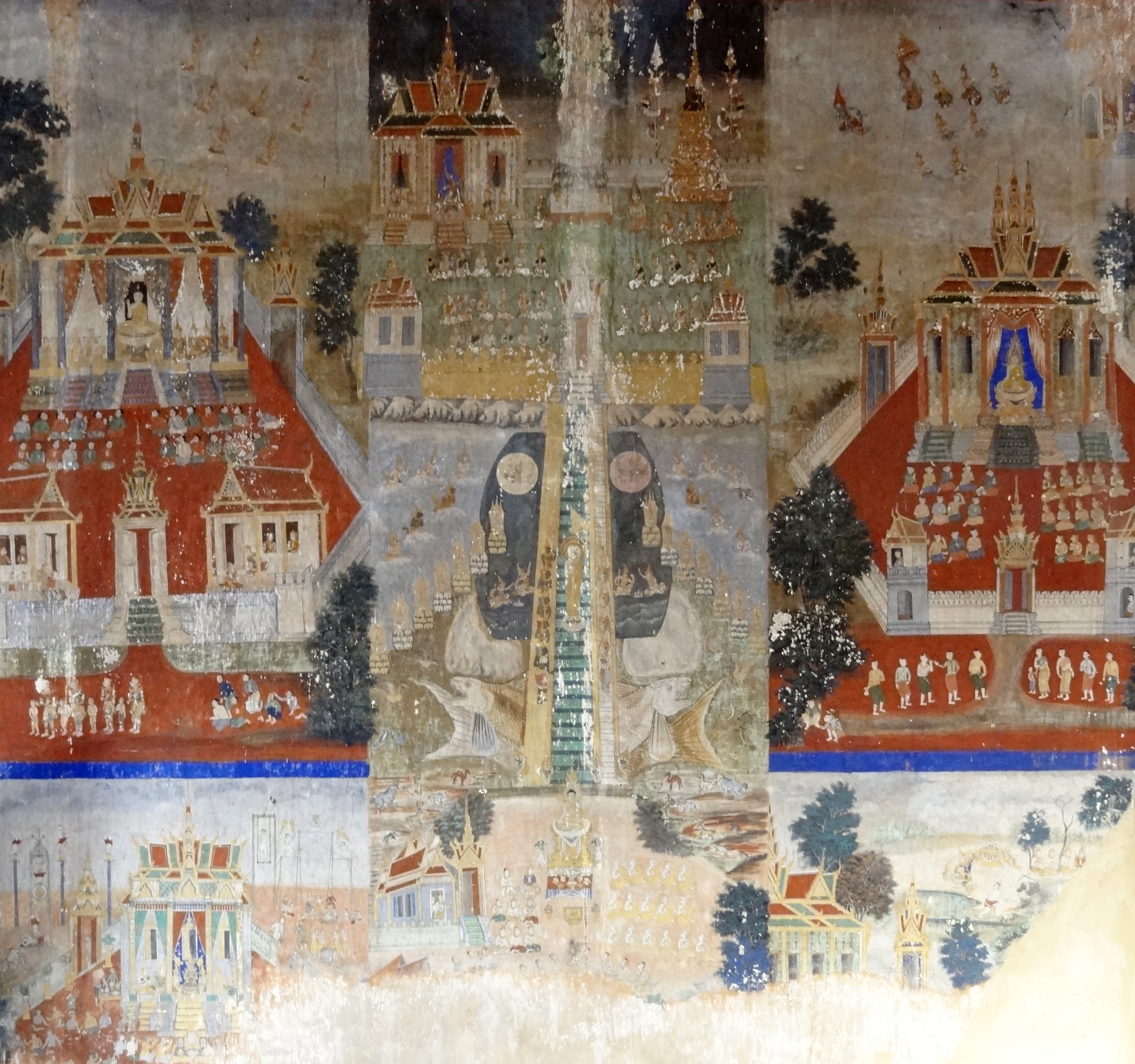
Murals at Wat Kampong Tralach Leu.

Wat Puthi Rokha Ram traces its origins to 1672, during the Oudong Era, a period marked by political turbulence in Cambodian history. The temple’s foundations are believed to rest atop an even older site, as evidenced by the presence of hefty laterite blocks forming its base and scattered around the grounds. These blocks suggest a possible pre-17th-century structure, though definitive evidence remains elusive. The current pagoda, constructed in the 1920s, replaced earlier buildings and stands as a testament to the site’s enduring religious importance. Its unique murail paintings are attributed to Khmer artist Tep Nimit Mak of the Royal Palace of Cambodia.

During the Khmers Rouges regime, the vihear was used to store salt and medecine resulting in flaking and fading of the original paintings.

The temple is surrounded by a moat, a feature that enhances its historical ambiance and distinguishes it within the region. Preservation efforts between 2003 and 2011, supported by local and cultural authorities, ensured the survival of its key features, including detailed architectural documentation and a scale model now housed in an adjacent traditional building.

== Architecture ==
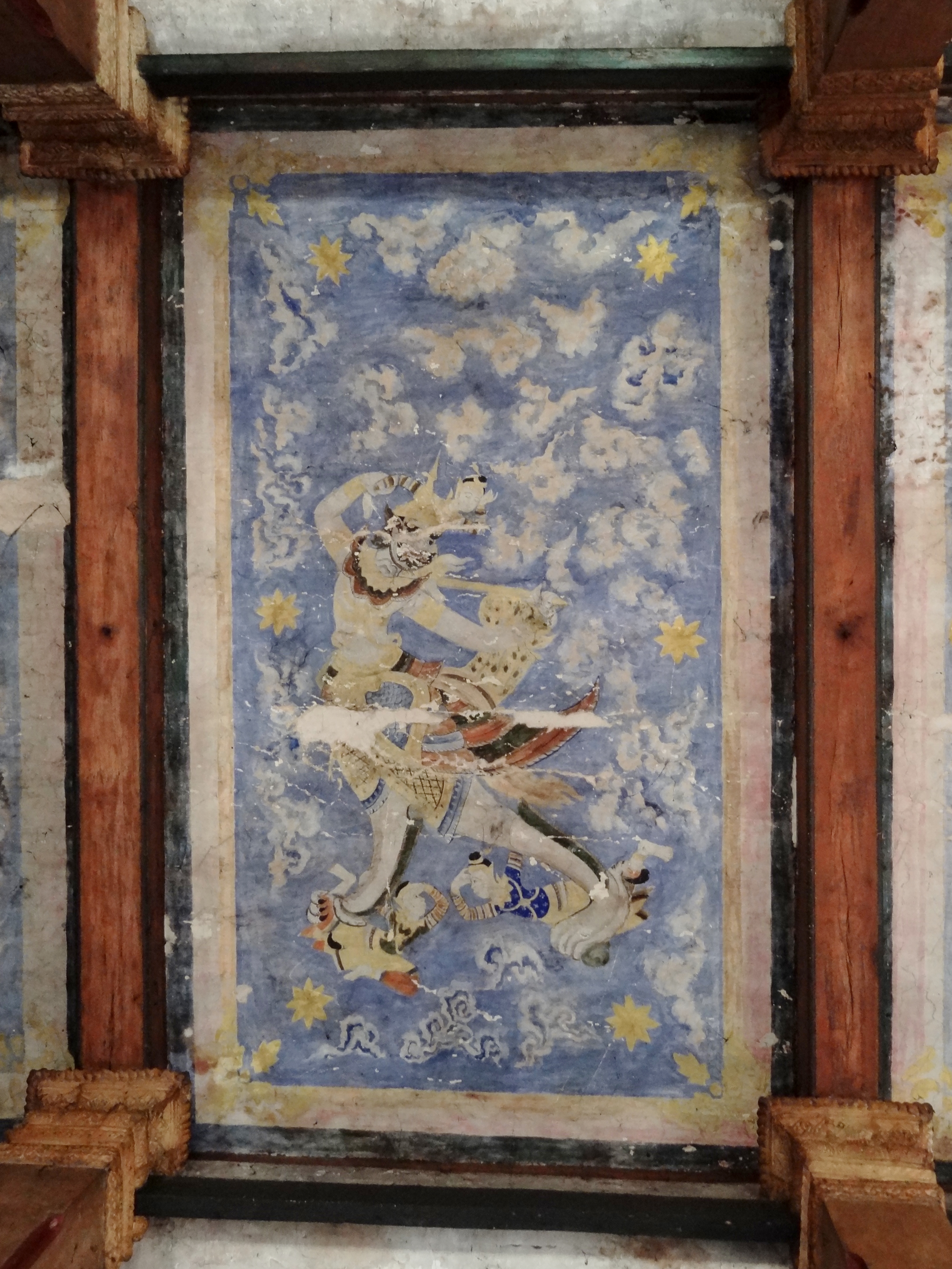
Painting ceiling of Wat Kampong Tralach Leu.

The architecture of Wat Puthi Rokha Ram blends traditional Cambodian design with elements from its 1920s reconstruction. The pagoda sits on a laterite foundation, a material commonly used in ancient Khmer construction, hinting at its historical continuity.

== Cultural Significance ==
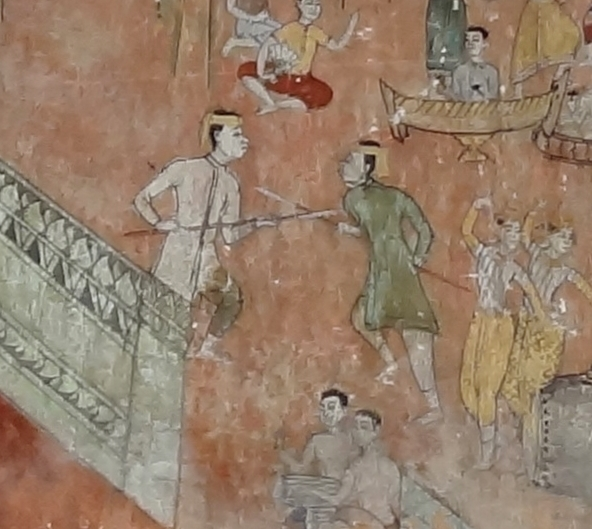
Details of murail paintings at Wat Kampong Tralach Leu, showing a pin peat ensemble and spear carriers fencing off with each other.

Wat Puthi Rokha Ram holds a special place in Kampong Chhnang Province as a center of Buddhist practice and local heritage. Its 17th-century origins and 19th-century murals connect it to Cambodia’s broader historical narrative, while its role as a community hub endures. According to historian Ian Harris, "Wat Kampong Tralach Leu and Wat Bo, Siem Reap, these are the sole remnants of Cambodian mural painting to have survived the vandalism of the period." The temple’s location amid verdant rice fields and vibrant pink water lily ponds adds to its picturesque and spiritual appeal.

Close to the other notorious pagoda of Wat Kampong Tralach Krom, the site has also become a focal point for cultural tourism, with the Oxcart Association of Kampong Tralach Leu offering traditional oxcart rides to visitors.
