= Tep Nimit Mak =

Tep Nimit Mak (Khmer:លោកឧកញ៉ាទេពនិមិត្ត ម៉ក់, born 1856, Cambodia) was a distinguished Cambodian artist, architect, and politician, best known for his contributions to the traditional arts during a transitional period in Cambodia's history under the French Protectorate. He is remembered for his significant impact on Cambodian cultural heritage and for promoting the arts during the late 19th and early 20th centuries.' George Groslier eulogized Oknha Tep Nimit Mak as an "old and faithful native collaborator":

His extremely wide knowledge of all the Khmer arts has permitted us to coordinate their study and to fix their traditions. Most of our teachers are his students. Thanks to his prestige among the better artisans of Phnom Penh, we have been able to rapidly organise the Corporations and win their confidence. He is therefore not only a master craftsman of great value... but also a devoted servant of the Protectorate whose good will has never been lacking

== Biography ==
=== Early life and education ===
Born in 1856 into an artistic family, Tep Nimit Mak began his training in traditional Cambodian arts at the age of 12 in Phnom Penh. He studied under a monk at the Thommayut pagoda of Wat Botum from 1868 to 1874, where he was introduced to the rich traditions of Khmer art. His grandfather was a sculptor, further embedding him in the artistic lineage of Cambodia. After leaving the monastery in 1875, he became a renowned painter:

=== Artistic career ===
Tep Nimit Mak became a renowned painter, known for his murals and artistic contributions to the Royal Palace of Cambodia. He led the project to paint the walls of the palace with scenes from the Reamker between 1903 and 1904, working alongside Cambodian artists under his direction. Despite the French colonial context, he maintained creative autonomy in these projects.

He was also recognized for his architectural contributions, having built significant structures such as the Royal Pagodas of Chruy Ta Keo and Phnom Del Wat Kampong Tralach Leu. By 1883, he was referred to as the head craftsman of the Royal Palace, and in 1897, at the age of 41, he was elevated to the title of Oknha by the king, signifying his high status and influence. He was later awarded the French Legion of Honor for his services.

While the ceiling paintings of the Salle des Danses are sometimes attributed to Tep Nimit Mak, they were in fact the work of French artists Francois de Marliave.

Tep Nimit Mak contributed to many other landmarks in Cambodia as he built the Royal Pagodos of Chruy Ta Keo, Phnom Del (Chong Prei), Phnom Kruong (Longvek) and Samret Thichei (Anluong Reach).

=== Teaching and Influence ===
In 1917, Groslier appointed Tep Nimit Mak as an administrator of the School of Cambodian Arts, where he played a pivotal role in teaching and mentoring young artists. He utilized diagrams from the bas-reliefs of Angkor Wat in his teaching, influencing a new generation of Cambodian artisans. His legacy continued through his students, many of whom became master craftsmen in their own right.

However, his tenure was not without controversy. Allegations arose regarding his favoritism towards certain students, with claims that he manipulated evaluations to benefit those who provided him with gifts. Critics accused him of stifling the development of true artistic talent among Cambodians. Mak's motives were clear to the writers o f the letter: “[Mak] does not seek to allow the development of progress among Cambodians. He does not wish Cambodians to be instructed; he wants all the services to be solely directed by himself in the interest of preventing the loss of his benefits”.

=== Personal life and later years ===
Tep Nimit Mak suffered from Parkinson's disease in his later years, which affected his ability to continue creating art. He retired in 1923 and faced declining health, becoming almost blind by the end of his life. His death marked the end of an era in Cambodian traditional arts.

== Legacy ==
Tep Nimit Mak is celebrated as an "old and faithful native collaborator" of the George Groslier, reflecting his deep commitment to the preservation and promotion of Khmer arts. His influence persists in the ongoing appreciation of Cambodian culture and artistry.

As many court artists, Tep Nimit was influenced by the training he had received in Thailand, where he had studied along with the first Patriarch, Nil Teang. on the occasion of a commission. Okñā Tep Nimit Mak went to perfect his painting knowledge in Bangkok before fulfilling the Royal Palace commission and the frescoes of the walls of the enclosure-gallery of Vat Prah Keo Morokot.

His mural paintings can still be observed at the Silver Pagoda, in the gallery of the Royal Palace, and in Wat Kampong Tralach Leu as well.

== Bibliography ==
- Bernard, Solange. “L'Imagerie Populaire.” France Asie, no. 37–38, Apr.-May 1949.
- Giteau, Madeleine. “Les Peintures Khmères de l’École de l’Okhna Tep Nimit Mak.” Udaya, vol. 3, 2002, pp. 39–44.
- Gamonet, Marie. “Le Ramayana au Palais Royal de Phnom Penh. II. L’École Artistique de l’Okhna Tep Nimit Mak.” Péninsule, no. 57, 2008, pp. 107–165.
