= Silver Pagoda =

Notable Buddhist temple in Phnom Penh , Cambodia

Silver Pagoda Wat Ubaosoth Ratanaram (Wat Preah Keo Morokot) Temple of the Emerald Buddha
- វត្តឧបោសថរតនារាម (វត្តព្រះកែវមរកត)
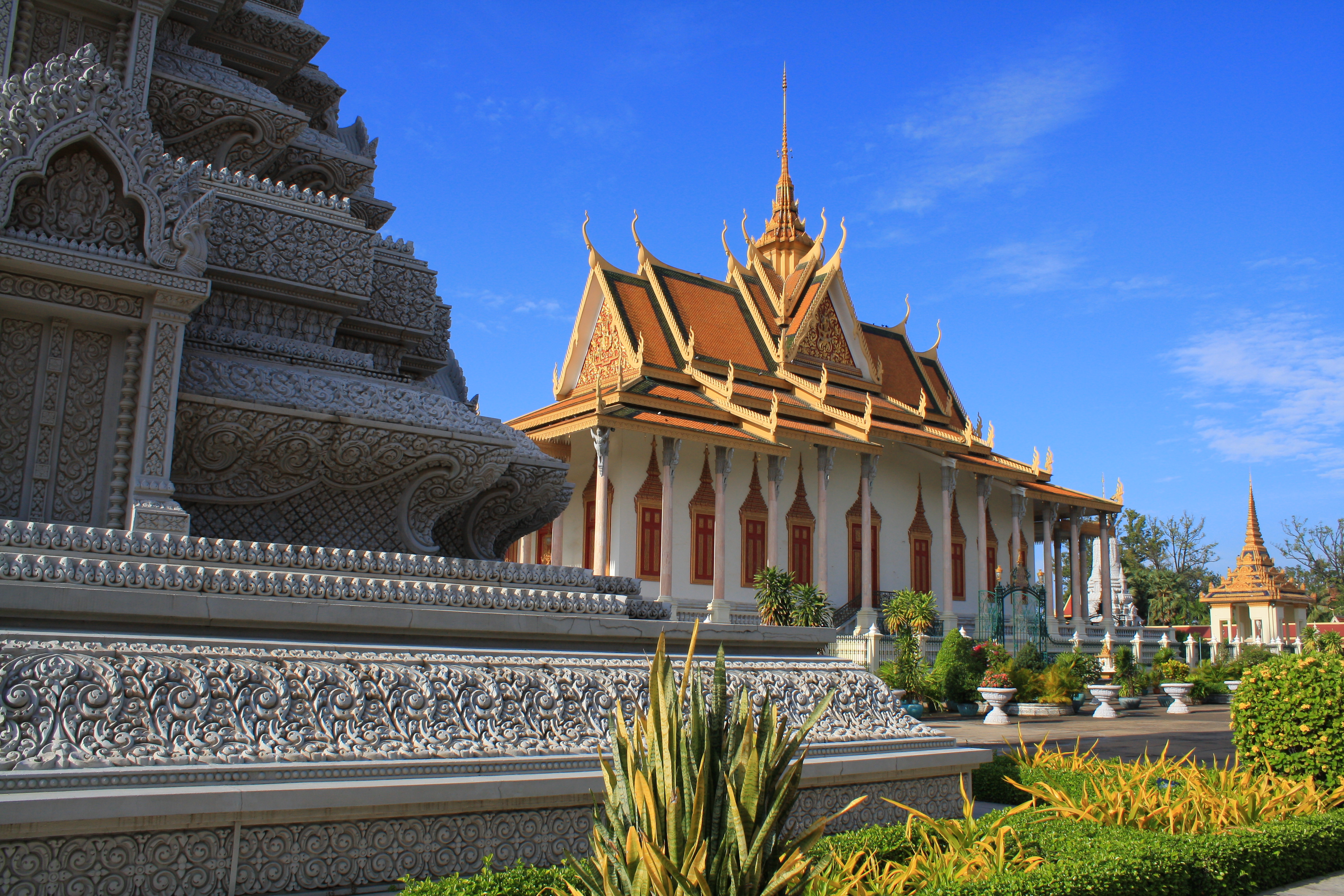

- Location in Cambodia

Religion
- Affiliation: Theravada Buddhism

Location
- Location: Samdech Sothearos Blvd (3), Phnom Penh
- Country: Cambodia
- Coordinates: 11°33′45″N 104°55′54″E

Architecture
- Founder: King Norodom
- Completed: 19th century

The Silver Pagoda is located on the south side of the Royal Palace in Chey Chumneas, Phnom Penh. The official name is Wat Ubaosoth Ratanaram (Khmer: វត្តឧបោសថរតនារាម), also known as Wat Preah Keo Morakot (Khmer: វត្តព្រះកែវមរកត, "Temple of the Emerald-Crystal Buddha") which is commonly shortened to Wat Preah Keo (Khmer: វត្តព្រះកែវ) in Khmer.

The vihara houses many national treasures including many golds and jeweled Buddha statues. The most significant is a small green crystal Buddha (the "Emerald Buddha" of Cambodia). Some sources maintain it was made of Baccarat Crystal in the 17th century although since Baccarat Crystal didn't exist until the 18th century it could not be by Baccarat. Other sources indicate it was made in the 19th century by Lalique, a glass designer who lived in the 19th-20th century. There is also a life-sized gold Maitreya Buddha commissioned by King Sisowath, weighing 90 kg and dressed in royal regalia and set with 9,584 diamonds, the largest of which weighing 25 carats, created in the palace workshops during 1906 and 1907. After the Cambodian Civil War the gold Maitreya Buddha lost most of its two-thousand diamonds. During King Norodom Sihanouk's pre-Khmer Rouge reign, the Silver Pagoda was inlaid with more than 5,329 silver tiles and some of its outer facades was remodeled with Italian marble. However, only a small area of these tiles are visible by the public on entering the pagoda.

The wall that surrounds the structures is covered with murals of the Reamker painted in 1903-1904 by Cambodian artists directed by the architect of the Silver Pagoda Oknha Tep Nimit Mak. The legend of Preah Ko Preah Keo is also represented by two statues.

It is a notable wat (Buddhist temple) in Phnom Penh; Its grounds being used for various national and royal ceremonies. The cremated remains of King Norodom Sihanouk are interred in the stupa of his daughter, Princess Norodom Kantha Bopha, localized on the temple's compound.

== History ==
Preah Keo Morakot temple does not have monks, so King Norodom Sihanouk went to live there during the construction of Preah Phnos for a year (on the 14th day of the second month of the year). On Kor Nopvasak, BE 2490 (31 July 1947), he was ordained as a monk and took the Temple of Preah Keo Morakot as a place of dharma learning in the practice of the Buddhist Dharma daily. Due to the fact that Preah Keo Morakot Temple had a monarch as a monk, this temple was renamed Wat Ubaosoth Preah Chin Rangsey Reachea Norodom Ratanaram (ភាសាខ្មែរ: វត្តឧបោសថ ព្រះជិនរង្សីរាជានរោត្ដម រតនារ៉ាម), which translates to the Divine Dharma Pagoda of the Radiant Treasure of King Norodom. This temple is also called Preah Vihear Preah Keo Morakot after the enerald-colored statue of the Buddhist honored at the central altar. This temple is called Wat Prak (the Silver Pagods) by foreign tourists as the entirety of the floor is covered with 5,329 pieces of silver tile. Altogether, the tablets weigh 1,125 kg. There are 1,650 artifacts on display in the temple, most of which are made of gold, silver, bronze and adorned with precious stones such as diamonds, rubies, sapphires and other precious stones. Most notable, the standing Maitreya Buddha statue is made of 90 kilograms of gold and contains 9584 diamonds, the largest of which is 25 carats. This palladium honors the shared history with the Lan Xang dynasty of Laos, with a form resembling that of the Phra Bang. Legend holds that this statue had been a gift from the Cambodian king to the Lao King Fa Ngum when the Thai king invaded Angkor (1352 - 1357) during the reign of King Suriyavong. The Maitreya Buddha was built in the palace workshops from 1906-1907 under the reign of King Sisowath of Cambodia. The walls surrounding the buildings are covered with Reamker paintings painted in 1903-1904 by a Cambodian artist led by the architect of Wat Prak Oknha Tep Nimit Mak. The legend of Preah Ko Preah Keo is also represented by two sculptures in the temple grounds.

== Mural on the walls of the Wat ==
On the walls of the temple cloister are paintings that tell the story of the Reamker from beginning to end. This mural was painted in 1903-1904 by 40 classically-trained Cambodian artists under the direction of temple architect Oknha Tep Nimit. Starting from the eastern gallery on the south side and surrounding the entirety of the temple grounds, it extends 642 meters long and 3 meters high. Visitors can interpret the story of the Reamker by circumambulating the outer galleries. The ancient paintings around the Reamker gallery show the peculiarities that are not captured or completely copied from the Indian Ramayana because in Reamker the story seems to be somewhat inaccurate. Today, these paintings are in a state of disrepair and are slowly disappearing due to weather and rock-eating germs, as well as vandalism. In 1985, the Cambodian government collaborated with the Polish government on a project to protect and restore the paintings, but the program lasted only five years with an insufficient and limited budget which expired before substantial completion. With a royal decree from Norodom Sihanouk, in 2015, the project was revived with the cooperation of a group of foreign and Cambodian craftsmen, which has restored the original vibrancy and definition of the myriad figures, buildings, and vegetation depicted throughout.

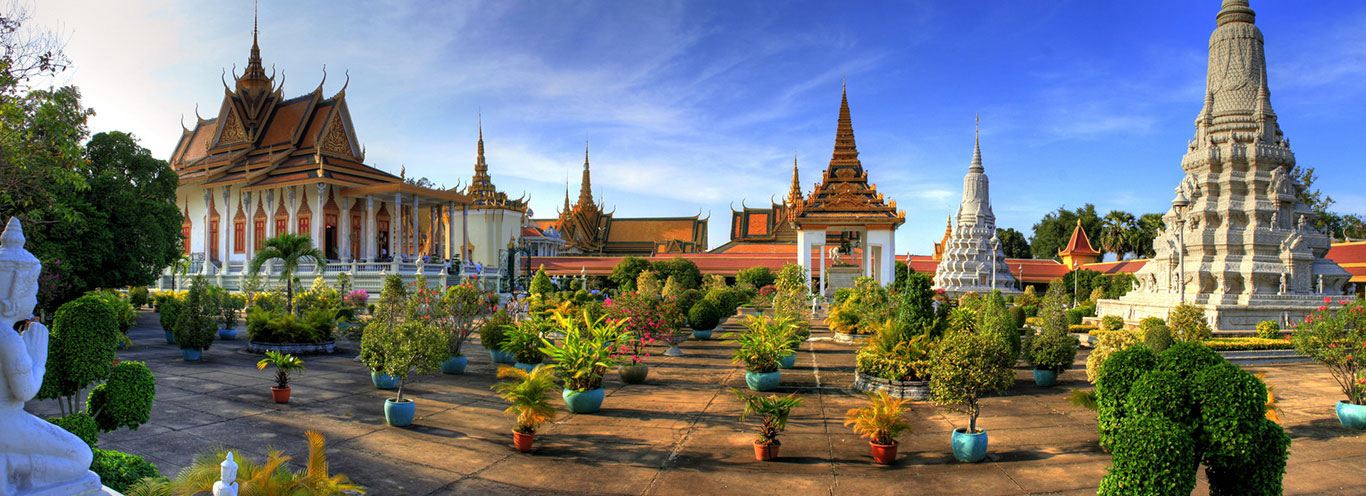
View of the Silver Pagoda complex

== Gallery ==
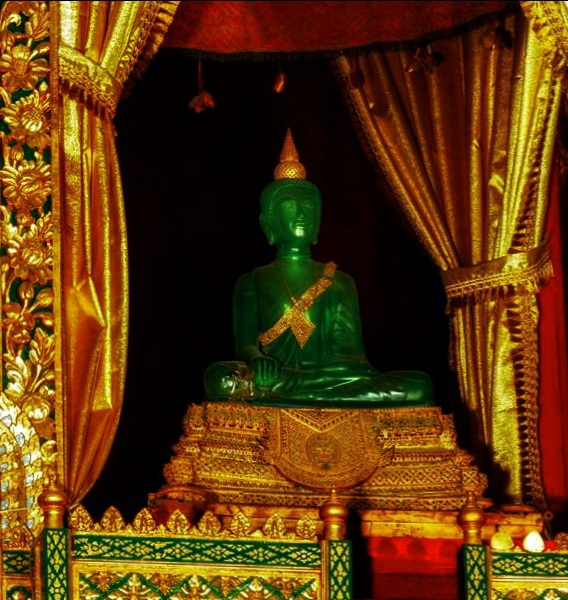
The Emerald Buddha of Cambodia

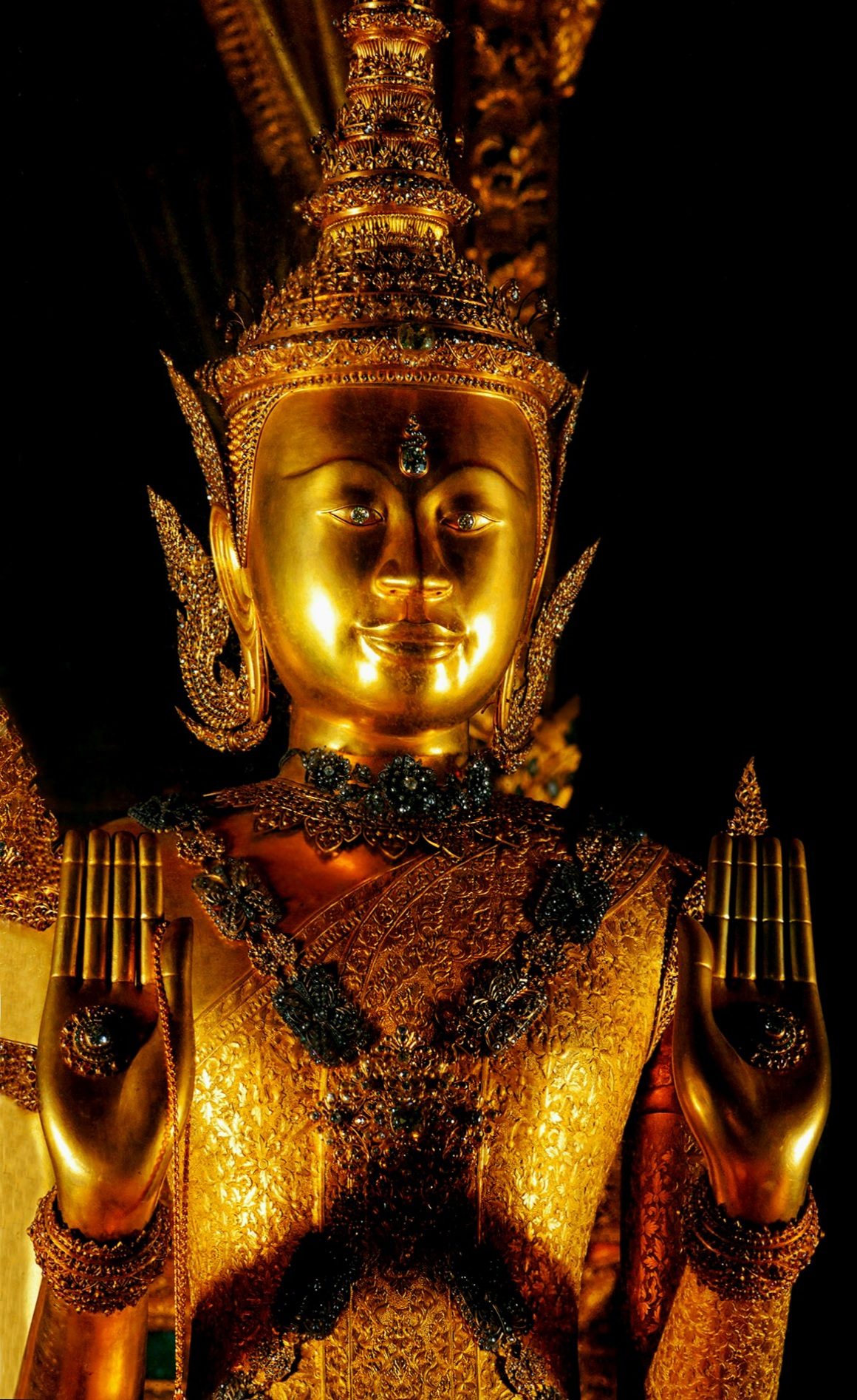
Golden Maitreya Buddha weighing 90 Kg and dressed with 9584 diamonds 1906-1907.

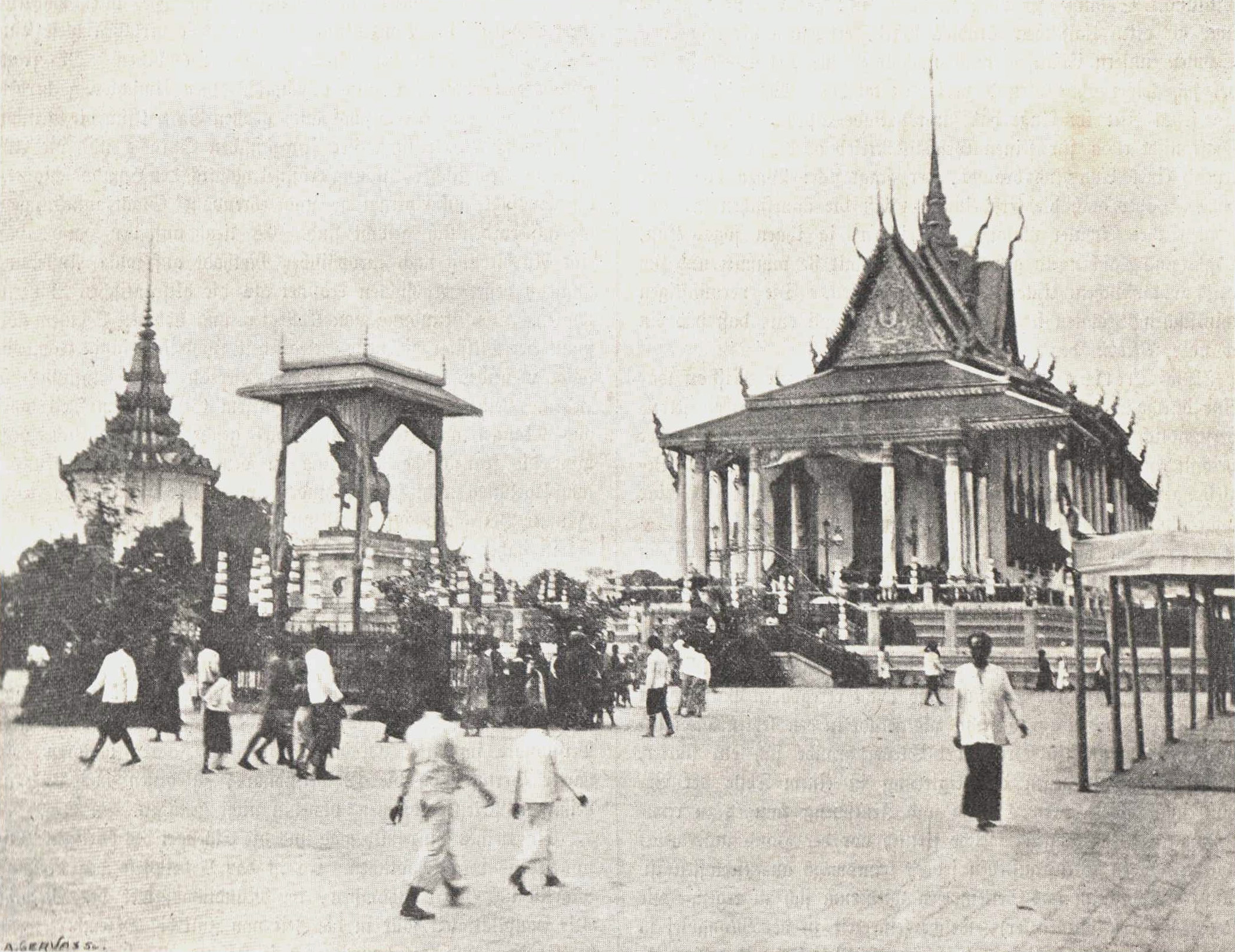
The Silver Pagoda in 1904

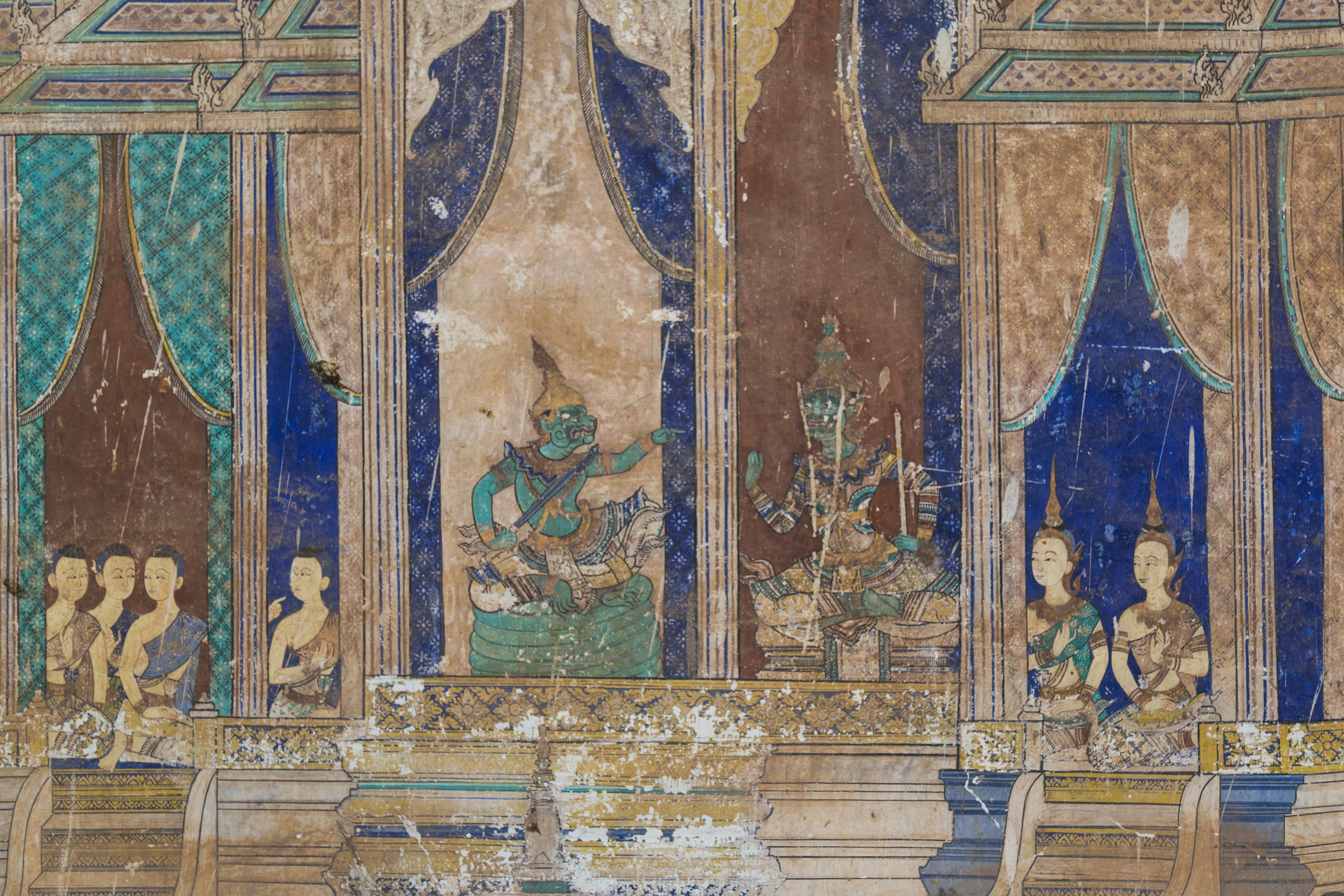
Mural depicting stories of the Reamker prior to the 2015 restoration.

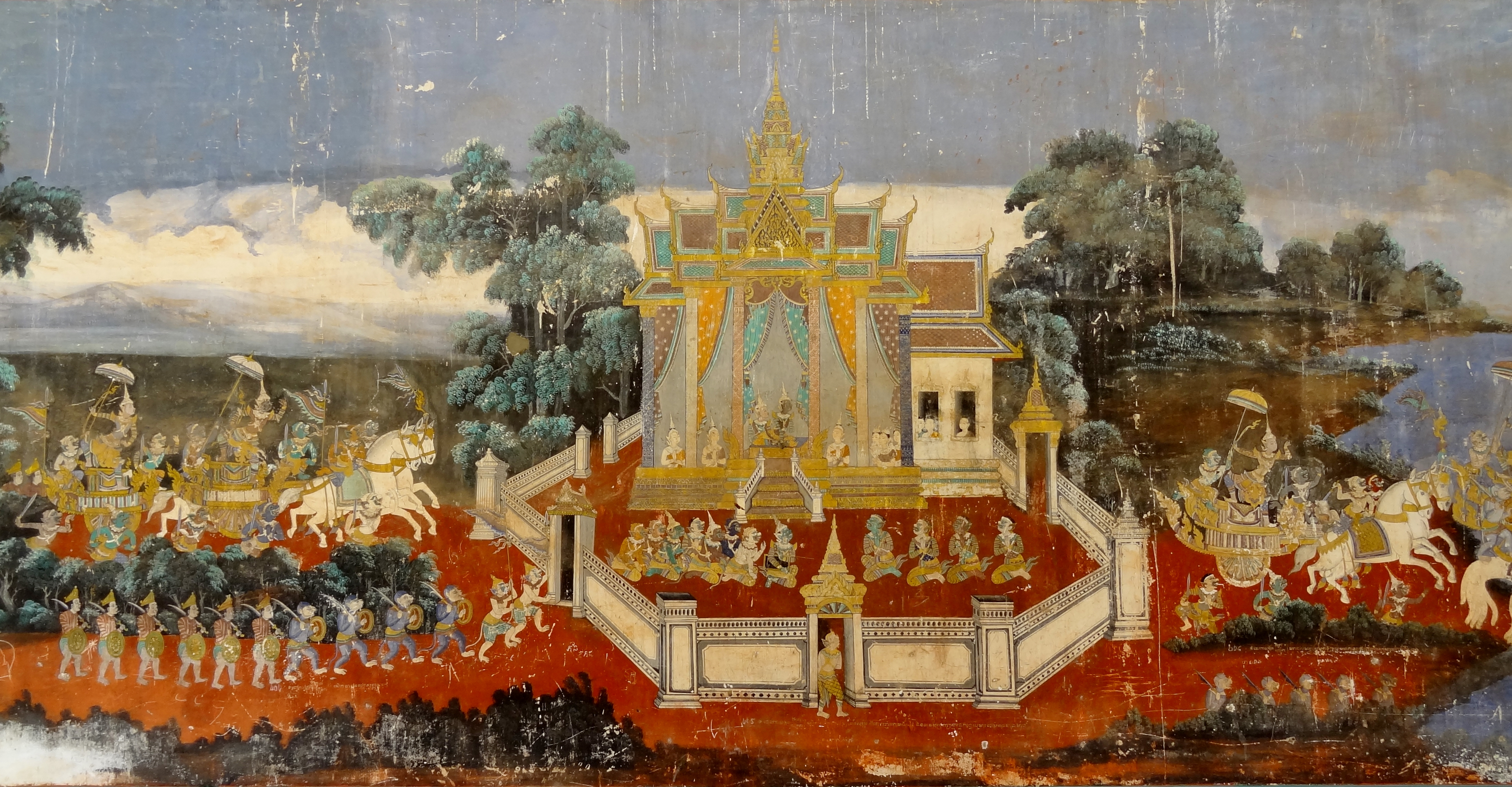
Portion of a 1903–1904 mural in Phnom Penh's Silver Pagoda

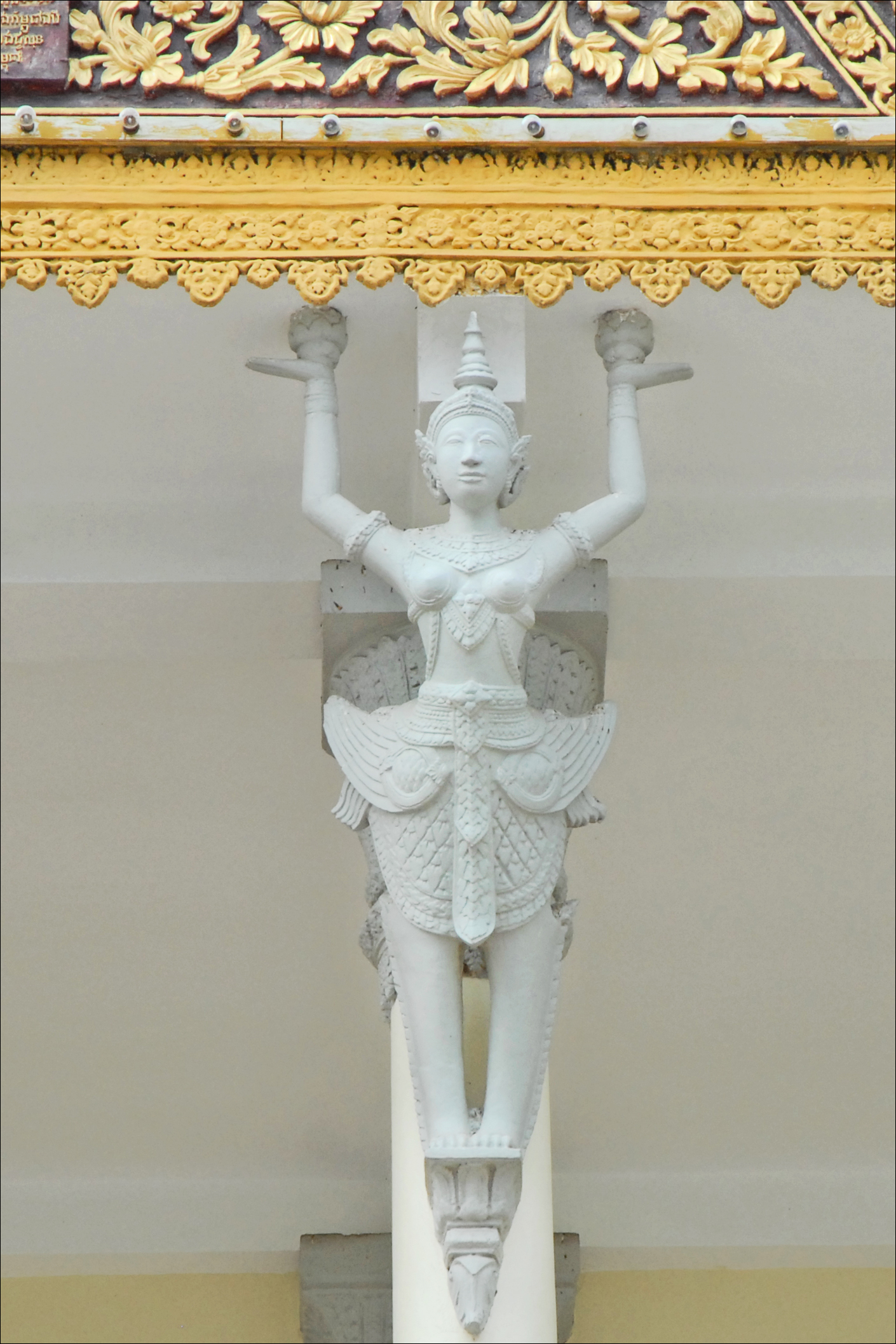
A decorative column figurine (Kinnara)

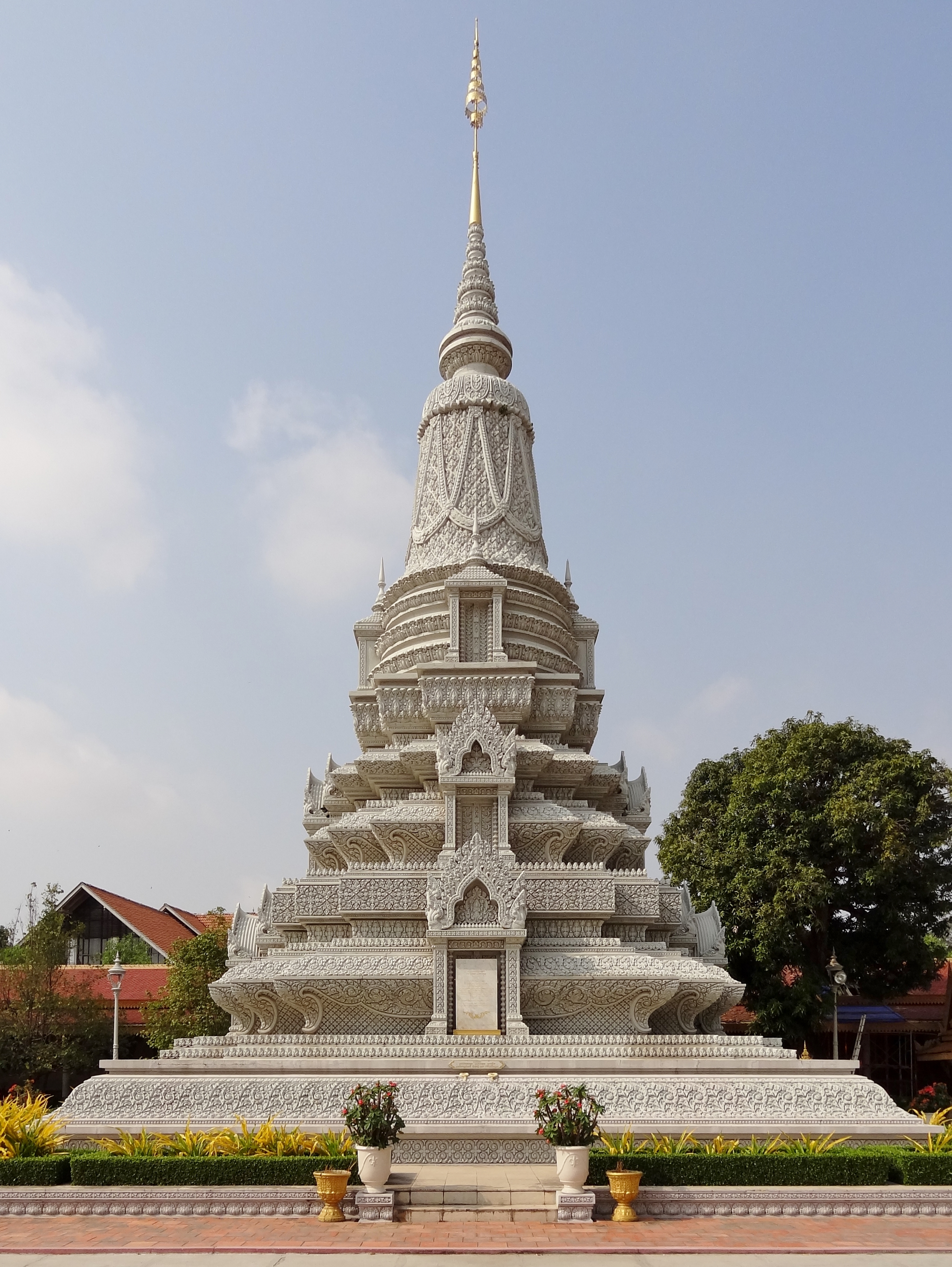
Stupa of King Norodom Suramarit

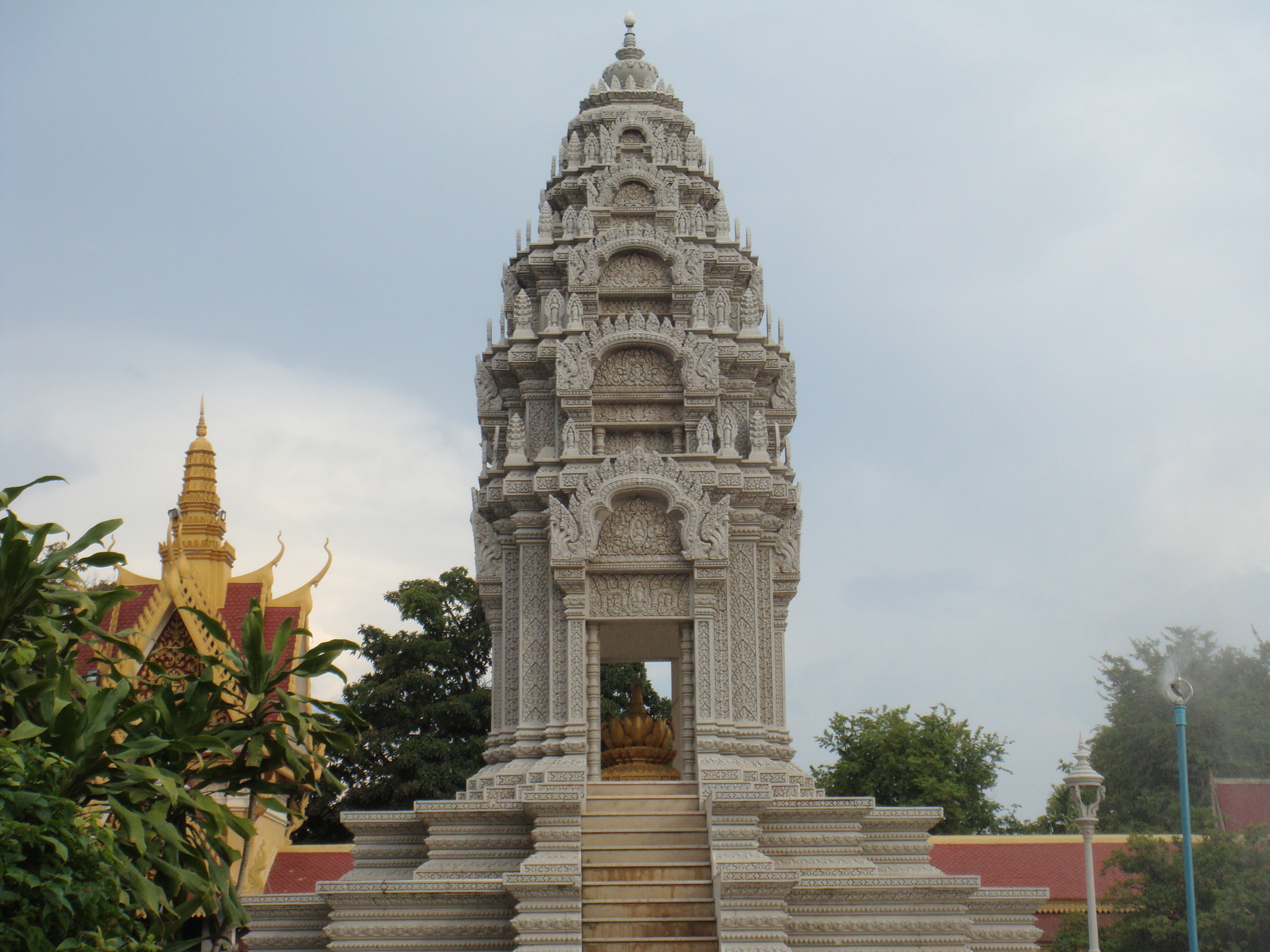
Stupa of Kantha Bopha

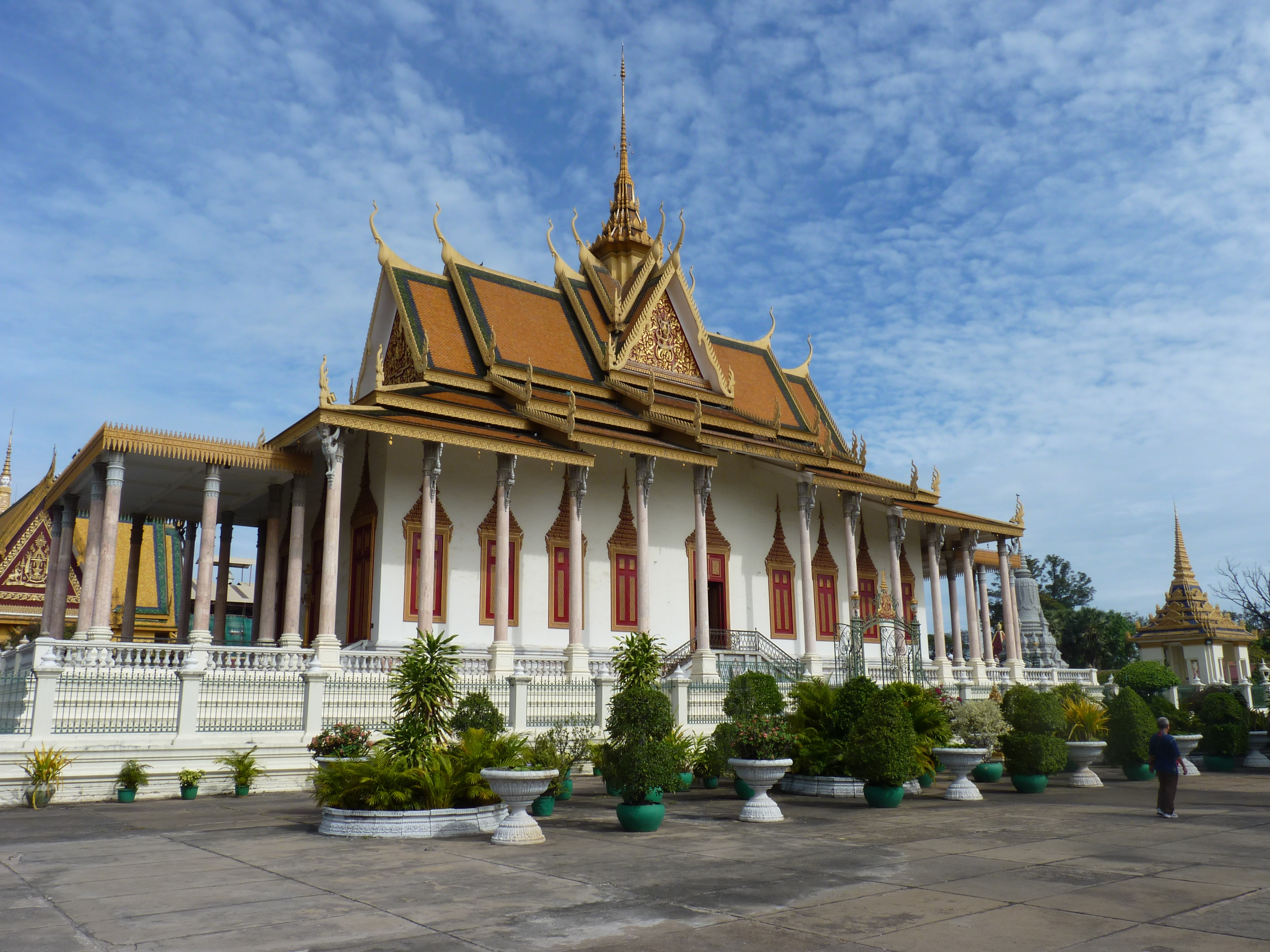
The Silver Pagoda in 2013

== Literature ==
- Lenzi, Iola (2004). Museums Of Southeast Asia. Singapore: Archipelago Press. p. 200 pages. ISBN 981-4068-96-9.
