= Trần Quang Diệu =

Vietnamese general of Tay Son dynasty

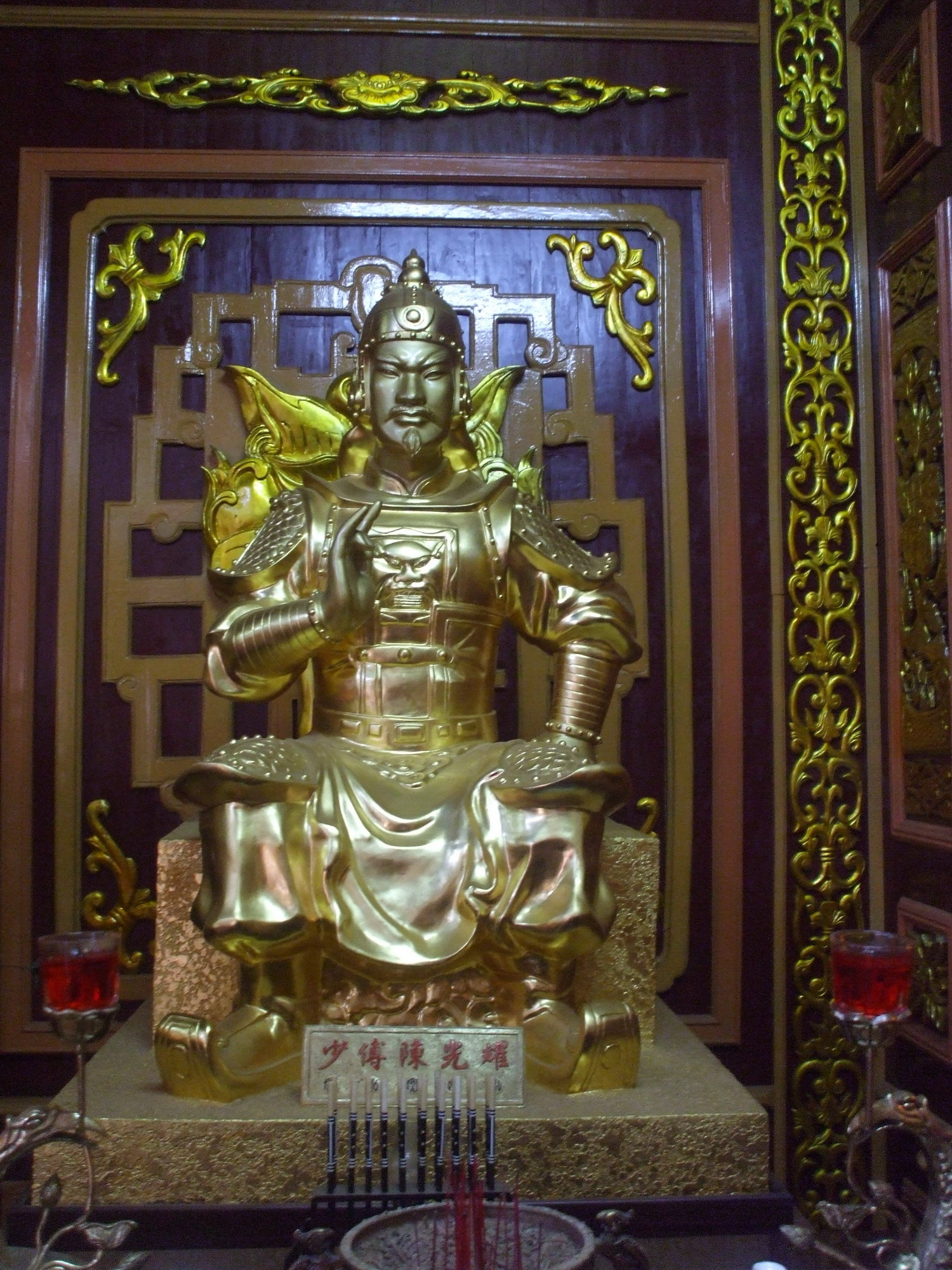
Trần Quang Diệu

Trần Quang Diệu (chữ Hán: 陳光耀, 1760–1802), also called Nguyễn Quang Diệu (chữ Hán: 阮光耀), was a general of Tây Sơn dynasty, Vietnam.

Diệu was the husband of female general Bùi Thị Xuân. He and Vũ Văn Dũng, Võ Ðình Tú, Nguyễn Văn Tuyết (Commander Tuyết), Lê Văn Hưng, Lý Văn Bưu, Nguyễn Văn Lộc (Commander Lộc) were known as "Seven Tiger Generals of Tây Sơn dynasty" (Vietnamese: Tây Sơn thất hổ tướng, 西山七虎將).

The couple joined the Tây Sơn army in early time. Diệu was promoted to Thiếu phó (少傅, "Junior Tutor"). In 1789, Diệu was appointed the governor of Nghệ An. There, he was ordered to build a new citadel, Phượng Hoàng trung đô (鳳凰中都). Nguyễn Huệ planned to use it as the future capital, but later it was abandoned.

In 1792, Diệu was sent to attack Laos together with Lê Trung. In the same year, he was called back to Phú Xuân when Nguyễn Huệ was critically ill. Huệ ordered Trần Quang Diệu and other ministers to support the successor Nguyễn Quang Toản on his deathbed.

In 1794 Diệu was sent to attack Diên Khánh. A coup d'état occurred in the next year, the regent Bùi Đắc Tuyên was executed by Vũ Văn Dũng, Phạm Công Hưng and Nguyễn Văn Huấn. Diệu was not trusted by the three generals because his wife was a niece of Tuyên. Getting the information, Diệu led his army retreated from Diên Khánh, and marched north. When the army reached Quy Nhơn, Nguyễn Văn Huấn came to meet him and asked for pardon. Diệu did not blame him. Finally, his army stayed at An Cựu. In the same time, an army under Vũ Văn Dũng and Nguyễn Văn Danh also marched there to defense. A civil war might break out at any moment, which made the young emperor afraid. Later, the crisis was settled by mediation of Phạm Công Hưng; Diệu was persuaded to reconcile with Dũng, and came back to Phú Xuân. He was appointed as one of regents together with Vũ Văn Dũng, Nguyễn Văn Huấn, and Nguyễn Văn Danh. Not long after, he was removed from military leadership.

Nguyễn Ánh besieged Quy Nhơn in 1799. Trần Quang Diệu and Vũ Văn Dũng was sent to reinforce. When marched to Thạch Tân, they found the road was blocked by Nguyễn Văn Thành and unable to reach there. Dũng was defeated by Nguyễn army. Diệu concealed the fact. Dũng was thankful, and made friends with him.

Hearing the news of defeat, Quy Nhơn surrendered to Nguyễn lord, its name was changed to Bình Định. Diệu and Dũng stayed at Quảng Nam. Trần Viết Kết and Hồ Công Diệu, spoke evil of Diệu, the young emperor ordered Dũng to kill Diệu. But, Dũng showed the letter to Trần Quang Diệu. Trần Quang Diệu marched to Phú Xuân, the young emperor had to arrest Trần Viết Kết and Hồ Công Diệu and transferred them to Trần Quang Diệu.

In 1800, Diệu and Dũng besieged Quy Nhơn. The siege of Quy Nhơn continued for over a year to June 1801, when the citadel's food provisions were exhausted. In the same year, Nguyễn Ánh attacked the capital Phú Xuân, and captured it. Diệu and Dũng planned to resumed the capital, but the road was blocked by Lê Văn Duyệt. Diệu besieged the citadel more actively. Võ Tánh, the Nguyễn general guarding the citadel, requested him to spare soldiers in exchange for Tánh's own life. Tánh committed suicide, Tây Sơn army captured the citadel. The citadel was then used as a base camp to attack Nguyễn lord.

30 thousand men under the young emperor marched south to resume the lost territory, but was utterly beaten in the mouth of Nhật Lệ River. The young emperor fled to Thăng Long. Diệu and Dũng abandoned Quy Nhơn. Diệu retreated to Laos, then to Hương Sơn District. He did not reached the destination, Thăng Long. Finally, he was captured in Thanh Chương District together with his wife, and transferred to Huế, in where he was beheaded.
