= Bùi Thị Xuân =

18th century Vietnamese female general during the Tây Sơn Rebellion

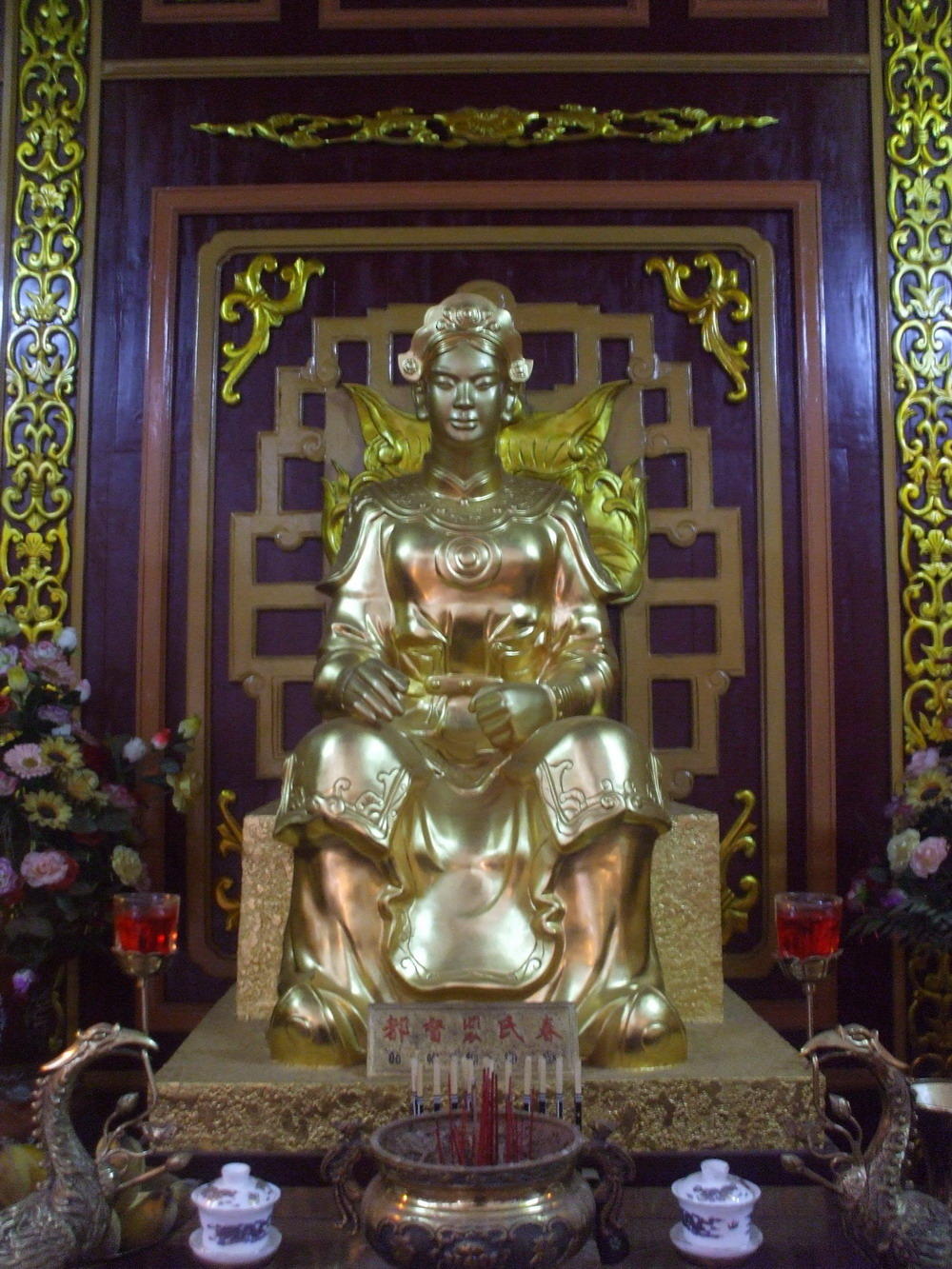
Statue of Bui Thi Xuan in Quang Trung Museum, Binh Dinh

Bùi Thị Xuân (chữ Hán: 裴氏春, d. 1802) was a Vietnamese female general during the Tây Sơn wars. One of the key figures in the Tây Sơn rebellion, known for her exceptional combat skills. She was not only a master swordswoman but also highly skilled in archery, horseback riding, and war elephant training. She commanded a war elephant division that trained and managed dozens of battle elephants. Her courage and charismatic leadership, alongside her husband General Trần Quang Diệu, made them two of the most important generals in the Tây Sơn army from its early days.

== Background and Early Life ==
Bùi Thị Xuân was the daughter of Bùi Đắc Chí and the niece of Bùi Đắc Tuyên a mandarin who served the court of the Tây Sơn dynasty. She was born in Xuân Hòa Village, located east of Phú Phong (now part of Phú Xuân Village, Bình Phú Commune, Tây Sơn District, Bình Định Province).

Born into a wealthy family, Bùi Thị Xuân received both literary and martial education at an early age. She was athletic, beautiful, skilled in traditional feminine crafts, had elegant handwriting, but possessed tomboyish traits unusual for women at the time, she liked practicing sword fighting and martial arts. When she went to school she often wore boys’ clothes, and even designed and tailored her own outfits based on illustrations of female warriors from books. Inspired by the tales of female Vietnamese heroes like the Trưng sisters and Lady Triệu who rode elephants into battle to lead and fight against invaders to protect their homeland and its independence, she aspired to follow in their footsteps, training in elephant warfare.

At the age of 12, she enrolled in a formal school to learn literature, but after being bullied, she became enraged, assaulting and injuring two of her tormentors and decided to return home. From then on, she abandoned school and devoted herself entirely to martial arts training. At some point, an elderly woman appeared and decided to take Xuân as a disciple to teach her martial arts. This training continued from early evening until the early morning the next day, at which point the old woman would leave. No one knew the real identity of the woman or where she came from. This training persisted for three years, except on stormy nights, and always began and ended at the exact same time. She was taught unarmed combat, dual-sword techniques, and methods for improving agility, such as high and long jumping. For high jumps, she started by tying small sandbags to her legs, gradually increasing the weight until she could jump without them. For long jumps, she initially used a pole, then fresh bamboo, bending it down to generate recoil for higher jumps. Practicing daily, and training every day, by the time she was 15, she was considered a master. According to Bùi Sơn Nhi of Xuân Hòa, the old teacher was the great-grandmother of Hương Mục Ngạc, a renowned martial artist who specialized in the traditional art of Võ thuật Bình Định in the Binh Dinh village of An Vinh during Vietnam’s later French colonial period.

Once she had perfected her martial skills, Bùi Thị Xuân invited other young women in the area to her home where they practiced martial arts and sword fighting. Initially, only having a few students, over time, their numbers grew to several dozen. Her exceptional abilities, combined with her strong leadership and disciplined, stern teaching style, earned her great respect and admiration among her peers. One of her most outstanding disciples was Bùi Thị Nhạn who herself later became a general and then an Empress consort to Quang Trung of the Tây Sơn dynasty.

In 1771, at the age of 20, Bùi Thị Xuân used her sword to rescue Trần Quang Diệu, a warrior who was being attacked by a tiger. This encounter led to their eventual marriage when Trần Quang Diệu sought shelter at her home in Xuân Hòa to recover from his injuries and the two fell in love. Soon after, they both joined the Tây Sơn Army, aligning themselves with the revolutionary peasant movement at the Phú Lạc military base and eventually later both becoming Generals.

== Military career ==
In 1771, during the reign of Lê Hiển Tông of the Revival Lê dynasty and the reign of Nguyễn Lord, Nguyễn Phúc Thuần, Nguyễn Nhạc was proclaimed King of Tây Sơn by his allies and local scholars. He led a rebellion known as the Tây Sơn rebellion that was led by him and his brothers Nguyễn Huệ, and Nguyễn Lữ. With the goal to overthrow the ruling Vietnamese elite families and the ruling dynasty. Under the pretense of opposing the corrupt regent Trương Phúc Loan and restoring the rightful heir, Nguyễn Phúc Dương, the grandson of Nguyen Lord Nguyễn Phúc Khoát.

To strengthen the movement Nguyễn Nhạc organized his forces. Military leadership was assigned to Nguyễn Huệ, Xuân’s husband Trần Quang Diệu, Võ Văn Dũng, and Võ Đình Tú. Economic and financial affairs were managed by Nguyễn Thung, Bùi Thị Xuân herself, and Nguyễn Lữ. Civil administration, diplomacy, and propaganda were handled by Võ Xuân Hoài and Trương Mỹ Ngọc.

In July 1775, Nguyễn Nhạc ordered Nguyễn Huệ to attack Phú Yên, leaving Bùi Thị Xuân and Võ Đình Tú in charge of the Tây Sơn stronghold. Nguyễn forces were defeated, forcing Tống Phúc Hiệp to retreat to Hòn Khói. Subsequent Nguyễn counterattacks failed, with Bùi Công Kế captured and Tống Văn Khôi killed in battle. In November 1775, Nguyễn loyalists Tôn Thất Quyền and Tôn Thất Xuân raised an army and captured Thăng Bình and Điện Bàn in Quảng Nam. Bùi Thị Xuân and Võ Đình Tú recommended Đặng Xuân Phong to lead the counterattack. Nguyễn Nhạc approved, and Đặng Xuân Phong quickly retook both cities, killing the Nguyễn commanders in the process.

In 1785, Bùi Thị Xuân and Trần Quang Diệu played a major role in the Battle of Rạch Gầm-Xoài Mút, where the Tây Sơn army annihilated a 20,000-strong Siamese force. While Nguyễn Huệ and Võ Văn Dũng commanded the navy, Bùi Thị Xuân and Trần Quang Diệu led the infantry. Bùi Thị Xuân personally beheaded the Siamese general Lục Côn in battle.

According to historical records, during the famous Tây Sơn victory against the Qing army in 1789, Bùi Thị Xuân led the war elephant division in the Central Army, which was personally commanded by Emperor Quang Trung (Nguyễn Huệ).

Over the years, she and her husband continued fighting against various factions that opposed the Tây Sơn rule, including remnant members and leaders of the Lê dynasty, such as Lê Duy Chỉ, who had allied with tribal chieftains in Hà Tuyên Province. By 1792, the Tây Sơn Dynasty had gained control of much of Vietnam, but on July 29, Emperor Quang Trung suddenly died, leaving the throne to his young son, Nguyễn Quang Toản (Emperor Cảnh Thịnh). The new Emperor was heavily influenced by his uncle, Bùi Đắc Tuyên, whose authoritarian rule weakened the court and rule.

During this time, In a year of famine, many districts in Quảng Nam experienced riots, and local authorities could not control the situation. The court immediately recommended Bùi Thị Xuân to be appointed as the Governor of Quang Nam. Upon arrival, she personally surveyed all the areas and ordered the opening of grain stores for relief. If she found any corrupt officials taking credit for others’ work or accepting bribes she would immediately remove them from office and replace them with only capable and virtuous individuals. Furthermore, she also issued a decree to stop hunting down rebel groups who were simply stealing to survive, and boldly declared that anyone carrying farming tools would be considered a common citizen. As a result, theft and resistance in Quảng Nam (especially in Quế Sơn district) quickly ended, and the people could peacefully continue their work. During this time, her husband Trần Quang Diệu was sent to Diên Khánh to defend against the onslaught of Nguyễn forces. In 1795, General Võ Văn Dũng overthrew Bùi Đắc Tuyên, Xuân’s Uncle, killing him and his son for abusing power. At the time, many suspected Bùi Thị Xuân would seek vengeance because she was the niece of Đắc Tuyên. However, unlike the rumors, she did not seek revenge on her uncle’s killer, nor did she take advantage of the chaos to side with the opposition or seek to establish her own power. He committed a crime and paid the price. Trần Quang Diệu feared instability and withdrew his troops back to the capital. Bùi Thị Xuân was also recalled to the Tây Sơn court.

Sensing the political turmoil, Nguyễn Phúc Ánh (the future Emperor Gia Long of the Nguyen Dynasty) launched a new offensive. However, when Nguyễn forces invaded Quảng Nam, Bùi Thị Xuân’s army crushed them in battle. Furious at being outmaneuvered by a woman, Nguyễn Phúc Ánh swore revenge. Once the Nguyễn forces retreated, Bùi Thị Xuân returned to Phú Xuân (modern-day Huế) to assist with court affairs and awaiting further orders.

In the spring of 1802, Emperor Cảnh Thịnh sent his younger brother, Nguyễn Quang Thùy, to defend Nghệ An, while he personally led an army to retake Phú Xuân. Bùi Thị Xuân was given command of 5,000 troops to protect the emperor.

As the battle turned against them, Bùi Thị Xuân rode her war elephant into the frontlines at Trấn Ninh, where Nguyễn Phúc Ánh was fortified. She fought relentlessly from morning until nightfall, her own armor and face soaked in blood and sweat. She even personally grabbed the war drums and beat them to rally her troops whose morale began to decrease. The Nguyễn forces were on the verge of collapse. However, Emperor Cảnh Thịnh panicked—seeing the Nguyễn army crossing the Linh Giang River, he mistakenly thought they were overwhelming his forces and ordered a retreat. Bùi Thị Xuân desperately clutched the Emperor’s royal robe, begging him to continue the fight, but at that moment, catastrophic news had arrived.

General Nguyễn Văn Trương had destroyed the Tây Sơn navy at Nhật Lệ (Quảng Bình), capturing most of their warships, and Nguyễn Văn Kiên, the Tây Sơn commander at the coast, had surrendered. With their supply lines cut off, panic spread among Tây Sơn troops, and many abandoned their weapons and fled.

This was Bùi Thị Xuân’s last stand, a heroic but doomed attempt to save the Tây Sơn Dynasty. After this crushing defeat, the Tây Sơn forces never recovered, and their downfall became inevitable.

== Death ==
After hearing that the Tây Sơn army had suffered a devastating defeat at Trấn Ninh, General Vũ Văn Dũng and her husband General Trần Quang Diệu knew they could not hold Quy Nhơn any longer. However, they kept resisting, fighting till March before finally deciding to abandon the city. During the turmoil they were split up with Emperor Cảnh Thịnh. They led their remaining troops and war elephants along the mountainous route through Laos to Nghệ An, hoping to regroup with the Emperor and mount a final defense.

In C. B. Mabon's words:

“Trần Quang Diệu, along with his wife and daughter, led a small group of surviving troops northward through Ai Lao (Laos). Upon reaching Châu Quy Hợp, Diệu descended into Hương Sơn and learned that Nghệ An had already fallen. His soldiers deserted him, and a few days later both he and his wife were captured… Meanwhile Emperor Cảnh Thịnh, along with his two younger brothers, and a few remaining officers, attempted to escape across the Nhị Hà river, hoping to flee into the mountainous regions. However, they were captured by the local people and delivered to Nguyễn forces in cages.”

Phạm Văn Sơn wrote of the accounts to Bùi Thị Xuân’s fate:

“[Nguyễn Ánh's] hatred for Bùi Thị Xuân ran deep because she had struck fear into him and his generals in Trấn Ninh. Hence, Nguyễn Ánh wanted to make her face brutal retribution.”

French missionary Pierre-Jacques Lemonnier de la Bissachère documented the execution in his accounts:

“Bùi Thị Xuân's young daughter (aged about 15) was stripped of all her garments. As an elephant approached, her face turned paper-white and frozen with fear. She turned to look at her mother and screamed, yet was sternly rebuked: ‘You must die bravely to be worthy of being my daughter!’ The elephant tossed the young girl up twice, impaling her on its tusks. Then, it was Bùi Thị Xuân's turn. She avoided exposing her body by wrapping layers of fabric around her. Calm and composed, she stepped forward and let out a thunderous shout, startling the elephant so much that it backed away in fear. The executioners were forced to fire rockets and stab the elephant with spears from behind, provoking it into a frenzy. The elephant then wrapped its trunk around her and flung her into the air, but refused to trample her body. Instead, it ran wildly around the execution grounds, roaring in terror, which caused the spectators to panic and flee.” ...

Seeing that there was no use executing Bùi Thị Xuân by elephant, Nguyễn Ánh ordered her to be burned alive.
