= Bùi Thị Nhạn =

Vietnamese female general of the Tây Sơn dynasty

- Kế hậu

Empress consort of Tây Sơn dynasty
- Tenure: 1791–1792
- Predecessor: Phạm Thị Liên
- Successor: Lê Ngọc Bình (of Emperor Cảnh Thịnh)

Empress mother of Vietnam
- Tenure: 1792–1802
- Predecessor: Empress Mother Mẫn (of Revival Lê dynasty)
- Successor: Empress Mother Ý Tĩnh (of Nguyễn dynasty)
- Born: ? Tuy Viễn, Đại Việt
- Died: 10 July 1802; Xương Giang, Đại Việt
- Spouse: Nguyễn Huệ
Names
- Bùi Thị Nhạn (裴氏雁)
- House: Tây Sơn dynasty
- Father: Bùi Đức Lương

Bùi Thị Nhạn (裴氏雁, ? – 10 July 1802) was a general and then an Empress of Tây Sơn dynasty.

She was born in Tuy Viễn District (modern Tây Sơn District), Bình Định Province. She was a daughter of Bùi Đức Lương, and also a sister of Bùi Đắc Tuyên. She is said to have learned martial arts as a child, later, she became a famous female general of Tây Sơn dynasty. She and Bùi Thị Xuân, Trần Thị Lan, Huỳnh Thị Cúc, Nguyễn Thị Dung, were known as the Five Phoenix women generals of Tay Son dynasty (Vietnamese: Tây Sơn ngũ phụng thư 西山五鳳雌).

Phạm Thị Liên, the empress of Nguyễn Huệ, died in 1791. Bùi Thị Nhạn became the second wife of Huệ and crowned as the empress. Nguyễn Huệ died in the next year, Nguyễn Quang Toản ascended the throne, and granted her the title empress dowager.

In 1801, when the capital Phú Xuân (modern Huế) fell to Nguyễn Ánh, she followed Nguyễn Quang Toản to Thăng Long (modern Hanoi). Nguyễn Ánh's army later captured Thăng Long. Afterwards, she fled to Xương Giang (in modern Bắc Giang). In order to avoid being captured, she committed suicide together with Trần Thị Lan.
