= Phạm Công Hưng =

Vietnamese general of Tây Sơn dynasty

Phạm Công Hưng (范公興, ?–1795) or Phạm Văn Hưng (范文興), was a general of Tây Sơn dynasty, Vietnam.

Phạm Công Hưng was a brother of Phạm Văn Tham and Phạm Ngạn. He also had a sister Phạm Thị Liên, whom was Nguyễn Huệ's wife.

During the civil war between Nguyễn Nhạc and Nguyễn Huệ, he joined Huệ's side. He was trusted by Huệ, and was promoted to Thái úy ("Grand Commandant").

Nguyễn Huệ died in 1792, Nguyễn Quang Toản ascended the throne. In the next year, Quy Nhơn was attacked by Nguyễn lord. Nguyễn Nhạc was defeated, and asked for Toản's help. Hưng led troops to reinforce Quy Nhơn together with Ngô Văn Sở, Nguyễn Văn Huấn and Lê Trung. A navy led by Đặng Văn Chân was also sent there in the same time. Nguyễn army had to retreat. Hưng marched into the city, claiming that the emperor of Phú Xuân had taken over it. Nhạc was angry, and died soon after suffering from vomiting blood. Nhạc's eldest son, Nguyễn Văn Bảo was granted the title Hiếu công ("Duke of filial piety") by Toản. Hưng came back to Phú Xuân, left Bùi Đắc Trụ to watch Bảo.

Phạm Công Hưng took part in the coup d'état against the regent Bùi Đắc Tuyên in 1795 together with Vũ Văn Dũng and Nguyễn Văn Huấn. They executed Tuyên, his son Bùi Đắc Trụ, and his political ally Ngô Văn Sở. The younger emperor could do nothing but weep. Getting the information, Trần Quang Diệu led his army retreated from Diên Khánh, and stayed at An Cựu. An army under Vũ Văn Dũng and Nguyễn Văn Danh also marched there to defense. The crisis was settled by mediation of Phạm Công Hưng; Diệu was persuaded to reconcile with Dũng, and came back to Phú Xuân. Hưng died in the same year.

He had two sons: Phạm Văn Định and Phạm Văn Trị.
