= Nguyễn Quang Thùy =

Vietnamese prince (died 1802)

Nguyễn Quang Thùy (chữ Hán: 阮光垂; died 1802) was a Vietnamese prince alive during the Tây Sơn dynasty.

== Background ==
A son of Nguyễn Huệ, Thùy was also a half-brother of Nguyễn Quang Toản. After Toản ascended the throne in 1792, Thùy was granted the royal title Khanh công (康公, "Duke of Khanh"), and tasked with mobilising troops and managing civil and military affairs in Tonkin. In 1795, the regent Bùi Đắc Tuyên was overthrown by Vũ Văn Dũng, Phạm Công Hưng, and Nguyễn Văn Huấn. Thùy arrested Ngô Văn Sở, a political ally of Tuyên, and transferred him to Phú Xuân.

In May 1801, the capital Phú Xuân was captured by an army of Nguyễn lords. The young emperor Nguyễn Quang Toản fled to Thăng Long, and lived in Thùy's house. In August, a troop under Thùy marched south and stayed in Nghệ An. In November, the young emperor led 30,000 men marching south. In January 1802, Thùy attacked Lũy Thầy (a strategic wall built by Đào Duy Từ, in present-day Quảng Bình Province), but was defeated by Nguyễn Ánh, and retreated to Nghệ An. In the same time, Toản was fully beaten in Linh River (modern Gianh River). They met in Nghệ An, and fled back to Thăng Long together.

== Death ==
In June 1802, Nguyễn army captured Thăng Long. Nguyễn Quang Thùy fled to Xương Giang (in modern Bắc Giang), and was captured by local villagers. In order to avoid being captured, he committed suicide by hanging.
