= Lê Ngọc Bình =

Empress consort of Tây Sơn dynasty
- Tenure: 1791–1792
- Predecessor: Bùi Thị Nhạn
- Successor: Tống Thị Lan (of Nguyễn dynasty)
- Born: 22 January 1785; Thăng Long, Đại Việt
- Died: October 10, 1810 (aged 25); Huế, Vietnam
- Burial: Trúc Lâm, Thừa Thiên Huế
- Spouse: Nguyễn Quang Toản, later Gia Long
Names
- Lê Ngọc Bình (黎玉玶)
Posthumous name
- Cung Thận Đức phi (恭慎德妃)
- House: Tây Sơn dynasty, later Nguyễn dynasty
- Father: Lê Hiển Tông
- Mother: Nguyễn Thị Điều

Lê Ngọc Bình (黎玉玶, 1785 – 1810) was a Vietnamese princess, youngest daughter of Emperor Lê Hiển Tông of Lê dynasty. Her early life was unknown, when the Tây Sơn dynasty succeeded Lê dynasty as the official ruling dynasty of Vietnam; Emperor Quang Trung ordered his Crown Prince Nguyễn Quang Toản (later Emperor Cảnh Thịnh) to marry her.

In 1801, Nguyễn Ánh's force, main rival of Tây Sơn, captured Phú Xuân and forced Cảnh Thịnh flee to Đông Kinh (Tonkin) and left Lê Ngọc Bình and his wives behind. Nguyễn Ánh captured but did not threaten Bình; then Ánh married her regardless of dissuasions of his followers.

Later, Nguyễn Ánh became Emperor Gia Long and gave her the royal title Đệ Tam Cung (roughly Third Wife or Third Concubine). Bình had with emperor Gia Long four children: prince Nguyen Phuc Quan, prince Nguyen Phuc Cu, princess An Nghia Ngoc Ngon, and princess My Khue Ngoc Khue. Le Thi Ngoc Binh died in 1810 and was buried in Trúc Lâm, Thừa Thiên Huế.
