= Vũ Văn Dũng =

Vietnamese general of the Tây Sơn dynasty (died 1892)

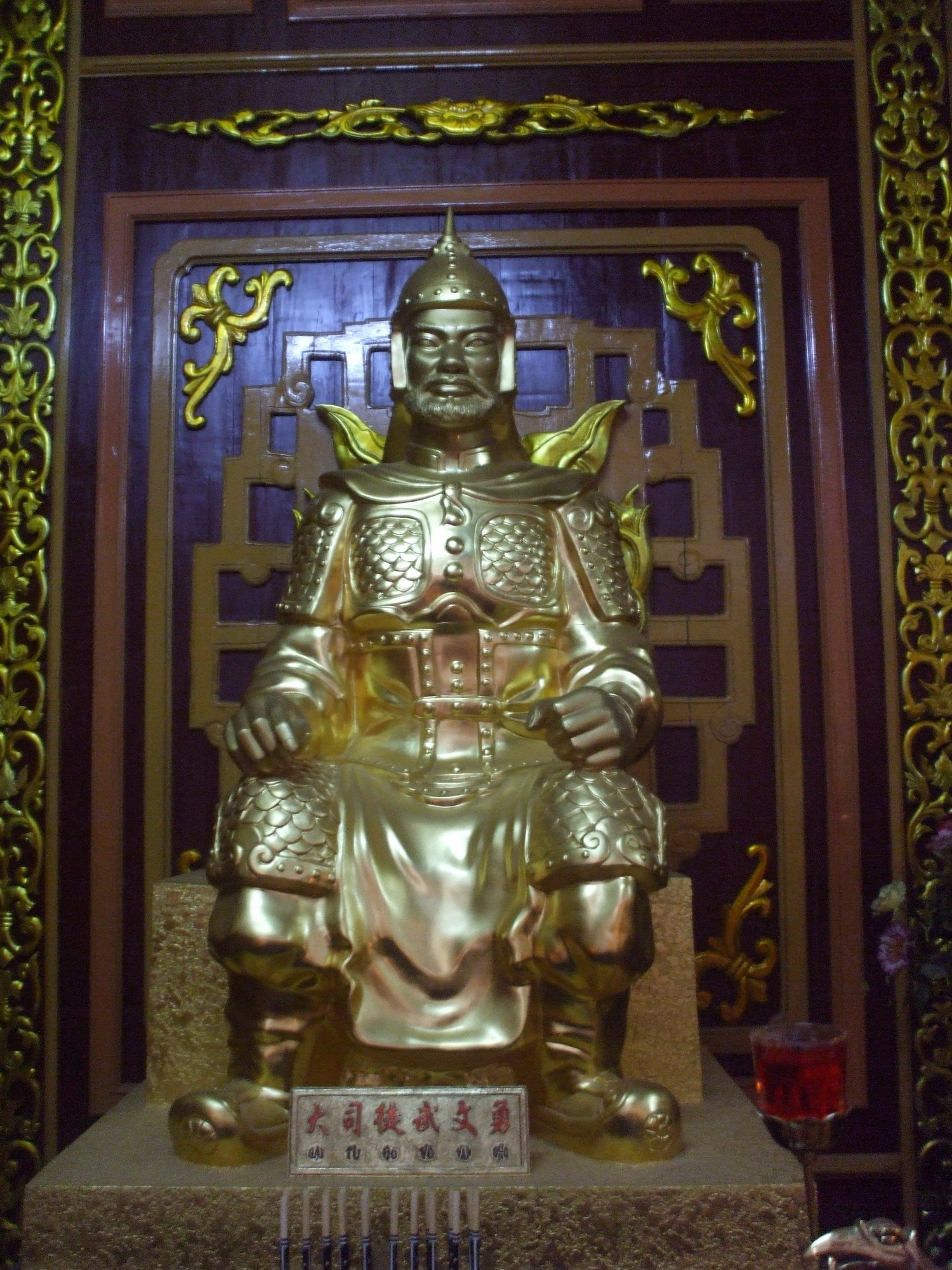
Vũ Văn Dũng

Vũ Văn Dũng (武文勇, died 1802), or Võ Văn Dũng, was a general of Tây Sơn dynasty, Vietnam. He and Võ Ðình Tú, Trần Quang Diệu, Nguyễn Văn Tuyết (Commander Tuyết), Lê Văn Hưng, Lý Văn Bưu, Nguyễn Văn Lộc (Commander Lộc) were known as "Seven Tiger Generals of Tây Sơn dynasty" (Vietnamese: Tây Sơn thất hổ tướng, 西山七虎將).

== Positions ==
At first, Vũ Văn Dũng was subordinate of Phạm Ngô Cầu (the administrator of Phú Xuân, appointed by a trịnh lord). In 1786, the Tây Sơn army captured Phú Xuân and Dũng surrendered to Nguyễn Huệ. He was granted the position Đại tư khấu (大司寇 "Grand Minister of Justice"). Later, he was sent to Tonkin to enlist rebel soldiers by offering amnesty.

== Conflicts ==
After Nguyễn Quang Toản became emperor at age 9, his new regent Bùi Đắc Tuyên replaced Dũng with general Ngô Văn Sở and sent the former back to Phú Xuân. On the way to Phú Xuân, Trần Văn Kỷ persuaded Dũng to stage a coup d'état against Tuyên. Dũng, Phạm Công Hưng, and Nguyễn Văn Huấn besieged the regent's house, arrested him, and imprisoned him. Dũng then ordered Nguyễn Quang Thùy to arrest Sở in Tonkin, while Huấn was sent to Quy Nhơn to capture Tuyên's son Bùi Đắc Trụ.

Sở, Trụ, and Tuyên were taken to Phú Xuân, where they were executed by being drowned in the Perfume River in front of emperor Toản, who could do nothing but weep. After the coup, general Trần Quang Diệu retreated from Diên Khánh and marched north to An Cựu. Toản was afraid that a civil war might break out at any moment, and sent an army led by Dũng and Nguyễn Văn Danh to defend against Diệu in case he attacked.

Later, the crisis was settled by Hưng, and Diệu was persuaded to reconcile with Dũng, and came back to Phú Xuân. Dũng was granted the position Đại tư đồ (大司徒 "Grand Minister Over the Masses"), and became a regent along with Diệu, Huấn, and Danh.

Nguyễn Ánh besieged Quy Nhơn in 1799. He was sent to reinforce together with Trần Quang Diệu. When they marched to Thạch Tân, they found the road was blocked by Nguyễn Văn Thành. The army under Dũng stayed at Chung Xá. In the night, a soldier saw a sambar deer pass by, and shouted: "con nai!" (a sambar deer!) It was misheard as "quân Đồng Nai!" (army of Đồng Nai!) by other soldiers, and shouted everywhere. The Tây Sơn army melted away in all directions, and was pursued by the Nguyễn army. Though they used to be political opponents, Diệu finally decided to conceal the fact. Dũng was thankful, and made friends with him.

Hearing the news of defeat, Quy Nhơn surrendered to the Nguyễn lords, who renamed it Bình Định. Dũng and Trần Quang Diệu stayed at Quảng Nam. Sometime later, the boy-emperor heard Trần Viết Kết and Hồ Công Diệu speak evil of Trần Quang Diệu and ordered Dũng to kill Trần Quang Diệu. But Dũng showed the emperor's letter to Trần Quang Diệu, who then marched to Phú Xuân. The boy-emperor had to arrest Kết and Hồ Công Diệu and transfer them to Trần Quang Diệu.

In 1800, an army under Trần Quang Diệu besieged Bình Định province. At the same time, a navy led by Dũng sealed off the Thị Nại Port. After hearing about this, Nguyễn Ánh led a navy to reinforce Bình Định. In January 1801, the Nguyễn army reached the Thị Nại Port. Two Nguyễn generals, Võ Di Nguy and Lê Văn Duyệt, were sent as vanguards to attack the Tây Sơn navy. Nguy was killed in action; Duyệt fought bravely, and set fire to Tây Sơn naval vessels. Dũng had to abandon the Thị Nại Port, and joined Diệu's army.

Nguyễn Ánh left Nguyễn Văn Thành to fight against Diệu and Dũng, and directly attacked the Tây Sơn dynasty capital Phú Xuân, capturing it. Diệu and Dũng tried to recapture the capital, but the road was blocked by Duyệt, so they had to besiege the city's citadel more actively. The siege of Bình Định continued for over a year to June 1801, when the citadel's food provisions were exhausted. Võ Tánh, the Nguyễn general guarding the citadel, committed suicide. The Tây Sơn army captured the citadel, which they then used as a base camp to attack the Nguyễn lords.

== Capture and death ==
An army of 30 thousand men under the boy-emperor marched south to recapture the lost territory, but were badly defeated in a battle at the mouth of Nhật Lệ River. The child emperor fled to Thăng Long. Diệu and Dũng abandoned Quy Nhơn and retreated to Laos, planning to march to Nghệ An and then to Thăng Long. But Nghệ An was also captured by the Nguyễn army. Finally, Dũng was captured in Nông Cống District and transferred to Huế, where he was beheaded.
