= Empress Phạm =

Empress Phạm may refer to:

- Phạm Thị Liên (1758–1791), wife of Quang Trung
- Phạm Thị Hằng (1810–1902), wife of Thiệu Trị
