= Phạm Thị Liên =

Vietnamese empress consort of the Tây Sơn dynasty

- Chính Cung hoàng hậu

Empress consort of Tây Sơn dynasty
- Tenure: 1788–1791
- Predecessor: Trần Thị Huệ (of Emperor Thái Đức)
- Successor: Bùi Thị Nhạn
- Born: 1758; Quy Nhơn, Đại Việt
- Died: 28 March 1791 (aged 32–33); Phú Xuân, Đại Việt
- Spouse: Nguyễn Huệ
- Issue: Nguyễn Quang Toản; Nguyễn Quang Bàn; Nguyễn Quang Thiệu two daughters
Names
- Phạm Thị Liên (范氏蓮); Phạm Thị Ngọc Dẫy (范氏玉𧿆)
Posthumous name
- Nhân Cung Ðoan Tĩnh Trinh Thục Nhu Thuần Vũ Hoàng chính hậu (仁恭端靜貞淑武皇正后)
- House: Tây Sơn dynasty
- Father: Phạm Văn Phúc

Phạm Thị Liên (范氏蓮, 1758–1791) was an empress consort of Tây Sơn dynasty, Vietnam.

Born in Quy Nhơn, Bình Định Province. According to Đại Nam chính biên liệt truyện, she was maternal half-sister of Bùi Đắc Tuyên and Bùi Văn Nhật. She married Nguyễn Huệ, and was crowned the empress and received the noble title Chính Cung hoàng hậu (正宮皇后) when she was thirty. She had three sons and two daughters, the eldest son was Nguyễn Quang Toản.

Liên died in 1791, and received the posthumous name Nhân Cung Ðoan Tĩnh Trinh Thục Nhu Thuần Vũ Hoàng chính hậu (仁恭端靜貞淑武皇正后).
