= Võ Di Nguy =

Vietnamese admiral

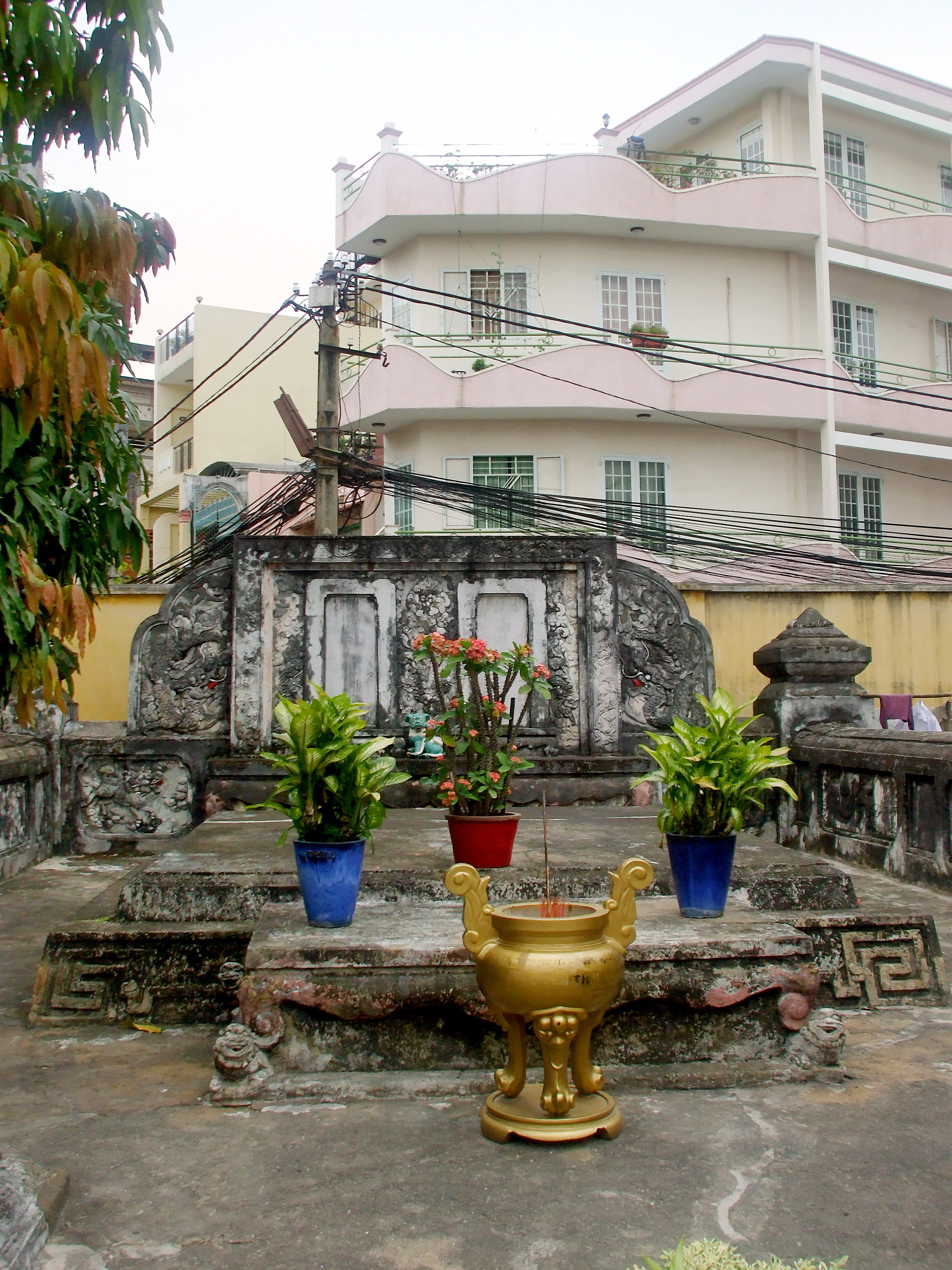
grave of Võ Di Nguy.

Võ Duy Nguy (武彝巍, Ất Sửu 1745 – Tân Dậu 1801) was a Vietnamese admiral, one of three admirals leading the Nguyễn Lord's fleet against the Tây Sơn army in 1793.
