= Bùi Đắc Tuyên =

Vietnamese mandarin of Tây Sơn dynasty (d. 1795)

Bùi Đắc Tuyên (裴得宣, died 1795) was a mandarin of the Tây Sơn dynasty.

== Early life ==
Bùi Đắc Tuyên was born in Xuân Hòa village, Bình Phú commune, Tuy Viễn district (modern Tây Sơn District), Quy Nhơn citadel (modern thuộc huyện Tây Sơn district, Bình Định Province).

He was a son of Bùi Đức Lương, a moneyed man in Xuân Hòa village. Bùi Đắc Lương had three sons, Bùi Đắc Chí (father of general Bùi Thị Xuân), Bùi Đắc Trung, and Bùi Đắc Tuyên; along with two daughters, Bùi Thị Loan and Bùi Thị Nhạn (empress of Quang Trung emperor).

== Grand Preceptor under Quang Toản emperor ==
Although he did not have much academic knowledge, with Bùi Thị Nhạn as empress consort of Quang Trung and his cousin Quang Toản as future crown prince, Bùi Đắc Tuyên was assigned as the deputy of Ministry of Rites (Vietnamese: Thị Lang bộ Lễ) and was allowed to work in the emperor's palace.

In 1792, nine-year-old Nguyễn Quang Toản became emperor. He appointed Tuyên, a favourite of his, to the position of "Grand Preceptor" (Vietnamese: thái sư, Chinese: 太師). Tuyên, now regent of the country, subsequently banished one of the ministers, Trần Văn Kỷ, from Phú Xuân.

His behavior angered many ministers and generals, and in 1795, Kỷ persuaded Vũ Văn Dũng to stage a coup against Tuyên. Dũng, Phạm Công Hưng, and Nguyễn Văn Huấn besieged Tuyên's house and put him in prison.

Dũng ordered Nguyễn Quang Thùy to arrest Ngô Văn Sở, who was a political ally of Tuyên, in Tonkin. At the same time, Huấn was sent to Quy Nhơn to arrest Tuyên's son Bùi Đắc Trụ in Quy Nhơn. Sở and Trụ were taken to Phú Xuân and thrown into the Perfume River together with Tuyên. The boy-emperor could do nothing but weep.
