= Nguyễn Quang Toản =

Emperor of the Tay Son dynasty (1792–1802)

Emperor Cảnh Thịnh 景盛帝
- Emperor of Đại Việt

Emperor of Tây Sơn dynasty
- Reign: 1792–1802
- Predecessor: Quang Trung
- Successor: Gia Long of Nguyễn dynasty
- Regent: Bùi Đắc Tuyên (1792-1795)
- Born: 1783
- Died: 1802 (aged 18–19); Phú Xuân, Đại Việt
- Spouse: Lê Ngọc Bình
Names
- Nguyễn Trát (阮札); Nguyễn Quang Toản (阮光纘)
Era dates
- Cảnh Thịnh (景盛, 1793–1801); Bảo Hưng (寶興, 1801–1802)
- House: Tây Sơn dynasty
- Father: Nguyễn Huệ
- Mother: Phạm Thị Liên

Emperor Cảnh Thịnh (chữ Hán: 景盛), born Nguyễn Quang Toản (chữ Hán: 阮光纘; 1783–1802), was the third and last emperor of the Tây Sơn dynasty. He followed his father Quang Trung (Nguyễn Huệ ruled 1788–1792) at the age of 9, and reigned for 10 years.

Cảnh Thịnh was defeated by the Nguyễn dynasty in 1802. He was taken, along with a number of his royalties, officials, and generals, to Phú Xuân. There, he was executed by Gia Long, first emperor of the Nguyễn dynasty.

== Biography ==
Nguyễn Quang Toản was the eldest son of Nguyễn Huệ (Emperor Quang Trung). According to Đại Nam chính biên liệt truyện, he was born to the Empress Consort Phạm Thị Liên. After Nguyễn Huệ crowned the emperor, Nguyễn Quang Toản was designated as Crown Prince. In 1790, Toản received the title An Nam quốc vương thế tử ("Crown Prince of Annam") from China. The title indicated that his heirship was also recognized by China.

Quang Trung died in 1792. On the deathbed, Quang Trung described Nguyễn Quang Toản as "a clever boy but too young". Toản ascended the throne and changed the Vietnamese era name to "Cảnh Thịnh" (景盛) in the same year, when he was only nine years old. He granted his stepmother Bùi Thị Nhạn the title Empress dowager. Bùi Đắc Tuyên was granted the position thái sư ("Grand Preceptor"). Bùi Đắc Tuyên was favoured by the young emperor, and became the de facto ruler of the country. Tuyên banished one of important ministers, Trần Văn Kỷ (陳文紀), from the capital Phú Xuân (modern Huế). His behavior had aroused the anger of many ministers and generals.

In 1793, Nguyễn Nhạc was attacked by Nguyễn lord, thus asking for Nguyễn Quang Toản's help. Toản repulsed the attack, then annexed Nhạc's territory. Nhạc died soon after suffering from vomiting blood. Nhạc's eldest son, Nguyễn Văn Bảo, was granted the title Hiếu công by Toản. Bùi Đắc Trụ (裴得宙) and Nguyễn Văn Huấn (阮文訓) were left in Quy Nhơn to watch Bảo.

Tây Sơn launched a powerful offensive in 1794. Two Tây Sơn generals, Trần Viết Kết (陳曰結) and Nguyễn Văn Huấn, laid siege to Diên Khánh in 1794, but Nguyễn lord's forces were able to keep them out. Several months later, Trần Quang Diệu and Nguyễn Văn Tứ (阮文賜) were sent to attack Diên Khánh again. However, a coup d'état occurred in the next year, forcing Diệu to withdraw. One night, Nguyễn Quang Toản was in Bùi Đắc Tuyên's house. Vũ Văn Dũng, Phạm Công Hưng, and Nguyễn Văn Huấn besieged the house, forcing Cảnh Thịnh to hand over Tuyên. Later, Tuyên was executed together with Bùi Đắc Trụ and his right hand Ngô Văn Sở. As a niece-in-law of Tuyên, general Trần Quang Diệu was not trusted by the three generals. Diệu quickly marched north and stayed at An Cựu. In the same time, an army under Vũ Văn Dũng and Nguyễn Văn Danh (阮文名) also marched there. The young emperor was afraid because a civil war could break out at any moment. Finally, Diệu was reconciled with the three generals.

Nguyễn Quang Toản started to rule the country directly; he appointed Trần Quang Diệu, Vũ Văn Dũng, Nguyễn Văn Huấn, and Nguyễn Văn Danh (or Nguyễn Văn Tứ) as his assistants. This arrangement proved to be unsatisfactory. Not long after, Diệu was removed from military leadership. Diệu was fearful and anxious, from then on, he refused to attend the imperial court.

The power struggle destabilized the regime, which provided Nguyễn lord an opportunity to launch an offensive attack in 1797. Nguyễn Văn Bảo occupied Quy Nhơn and planned to surrender to Nguyễn lord. Later on, the rebellion was put down in 1798, however, many ministers were accused of getting involved in the incident, including Lê Trung (黎忠) and Nguyễn Văn Huấn, causing them to get arrested and executed. Tây Sơn generals felt themselves imperilled, as they were at odds with the emperor.

In 1799, Quy Nhơn was besieged by Nguyễn Ánh. Trần Quang Diệu and Vũ Văn Dũng was sent to reinforce, but was ambushed by Nguyễn army in Thạch Tân. Hearing the news of defeat, governor Lê Văn Thanh (黎文清) surrendered to Nguyễn Ánh. Quy Nhơn was captured by Nguyễn lord, and its name was changed to Bình Định. Trần Viết Kết and Hồ Công Diệu (胡公曜) spoke evil of Trần Quang Diệu. Nguyễn Quang Toản ordered Dũng to kill Diệu, but Dũng showed the letter to Trần Quang Diệu, leading Trần Quang Diệu to march to Phú Xuân. Hồ Công Diệu was chosen as a scapegoat; he was arrested and transferred to Trần Quang Diệu.

In 1800, Trần Quang Diệu and Vũ Văn Dũng were sent south to besiege Quy Nhơn. Nguyễn Ánh led a large number of army to reinforce Bình Định. However, Võ Tánh, the governor of Bình Định, suggested that he would pin the main Tây Sơn force down there so that Nguyễn Ánh could attack their capital Phú Xuân. Ánh agreed, and then he marched north.

In this time, Nguyễn Quang Toản had to deal with several internal rebellions. Hà Công Thái (何功泰), a Degar leader, revolted in Thanh Hóa Province and pledged loyalty to Nguyễn lord; a Christian-inspired revolt broke out in Tonkin. To make matters worse, Vientiane and Muang Phuan attacked Nghệ An Province, cooperating with Nguyễn forces.

Nguyễn Quang Toản had to ask Nguyễn Thiếp for advice. Thiếp said it was impossible to deal with current affairs; however, if the capital could be relocated in Phượng Hoàng trung đô (鳳凰中都, in present-day Vinh), the lifetime of the dynasty may be prolonged. Toản vacillated for too long and the opportunity to accept was lost. In 1801, Nguyễn Ánh's army reached Tư Dung estuary (present-day Tư Hiền estuary), defeating Nguyễn Văn Trị in Quy Sơn Hill. A naval battle broke out in Nộn estuary (present-day Thuận An estuary); both Nguyễn Quang Toản and Nguyễn Ánh directed the battle personally. Many Chinese pirates were hired by Tây Sơn to fight against Nguyễn lord. In Nguyễn lord's side, several Western adventurers joined the battle, including Jean-Baptiste Chaigneau, Philippe Vannier, and Laurent André Barisy. Chaigneau described it as the fiercest battle between Tây Sơn dynasty and Nguyễn lord. The battle ended with a near annihilation of both Tây Sơn navy and Chinese pirates. Three famous pirates, Mo Guanfu, Liang Wengeng (梁文庚, Lương Văn Canh), and Fan Wencai (樊文才 Phàn Văn Tài), were captured by Nguyễn lord.

The Nguyễn army soon occupied the capital Phú Xuân. Nguyễn Quang Toản fled to Đồng Hới with a dozen men, then to Thăng Long. In there, he was supported by his brother Nguyễn Quang Thùy. Nguyễn Quang Toản changed the Vietnamese era name to "Bảo Hưng" (寶興). He made efforts to gain popularity among Northern Vietnamese. In foreign affairs, he sent an envoy to seek aid from the Jiaqing Emperor of Qing China. Meanwhile, Nguyễn Ánh also sent an envoy, extraditing Mo Guanfu, Liang Wengeng, and Fan Wencai to China. The three pirates confessed that they were supported by Tây Sơn dynasty, proving that the Tây Sơn dynasty had shielded many Chinese pirates. Before this incident, the Chinese government had captured two pirates, Wang Guili (王貴利, Vương Quý Lợi) and Fan Guangxi (范光喜, Phạm Quang Hỉ); in their vessels, the Chinese found two Tây Sơn official seals. The irate Jiaqing rejected to help Nguyễn Quang Toản, and deported his envoy.

In 1802, Nguyễn Quang Thùy was sent to attack Lũy Thầy (in present-day Quảng Bình Province). Later, Nguyễn Quang Toản led around 30,000 men to march to Linh River (modern Gianh River) to attack Nguyễn Ánh. Both of their armies were beaten. Toản fled to Nghệ An, where he met Nguyễn Quang Thùy. They fled back to Thăng Long together.

Nguyễn Ánh's army marched further north. In June, they captured Thăng Long. Nguyễn Quang Toản fled across the Nhị River (present day Red River) along with Nguyễn Quang Thùy, Nguyễn Quang Thiệu (阮光紹), Nguyễn Văn Dụng (阮文用), Nguyễn Văn Tứ, and the Empress dowager Bùi Thị Nhạn. In Phượng Nhãn (Lạng Giang), They were captured alive by local villagers. Nguyễn Quang Thùy and Bùi Thị Nhạn committed suicide; the others were transferred to Phú Xuân and executed by Nguyễn Ánh. According to Đại Nam thực lục, Nguyễn Quang Toản and his three brothers, Nguyễn Quang Duy (阮光維), Nguyễn Quang Thiệu, and Nguyễn Quang Bàn (阮光盤), were executed by slow slicing, then their bodies were dismembered by five elephants (五象分屍).

== Sources ==
- Trần Trọng Kim (2005). Việt Nam sử lược (in Vietnamese). Ho Chi Minh City: Ho Chi Minh City General Publishing House.
- Quốc sử quán triều Nguyễn (2007). Đại Nam thực lục chính biên. Vol. Tập một: Tiền biên và Chính biên-Kỷ thứ nhất (từ 1558 đến 1819) (bản dịch của Viện Sử học Việt Nam ed.). Hà Nội: Nhà xuất bản Giáo dục..

Nguyễn Quang Toản Tây Sơn dynasty Born: 1792 Died: 1802
Regnal titles
Preceded by Quang Trung	Emperor of Đại Việt; 1792–1802	Succeeded by Gia Long as Emperor of the Nguyễn dynasty, Việt Nam
