= Nguyễn Văn Thành =

Vietnamese general (1758 – 1817)

Nguyễn Văn Thành (chữ Hán: 阮文誠; 1758 – 1817) was a Vietnamese general who was governor of Gia Định Province. He conflicted with the emperor Nguyễn Phúc Ánh or Gia Long, on several occasions, including using money reserved for purchasing military provisions to pay off gambling debts for his Gia Định soldiers in Siam. Thành was elevated by the king, but later, following a poem written by his son in 1815, Gia Long had the son executed. Phan Châu Trinh records that the emperor had also had Thành himself and Thành's elderly father executed. In effect this was the case, as Thành was driven to take his own life.
