= Phú Xuân =

Historic capital in Vietnam

Coordinates: 16°28′N 107°35′E

Phú Xuân (富春) was the historic capital of the Nguyễn lords, the Tây Sơn dynasty, and later became the Nguyễn dynasty's capital (renamed Huế).

== History ==
In 1306, the King of Champa Chế Mân offered Vietnam two Chăm prefectures, Ô and Lý, in exchange for marriage with a Vietnamese princess Huyền Trân. The Vietnamese Emperor Trần Anh Tông accepted this offer. He took and renamed Ô and Lý prefectures to Thuận prefecture (順州, Thuận Châu) and Hóa prefecture (化州, Hóa Châu), respectively, with both of them often referred to as Thuận Hóa region.

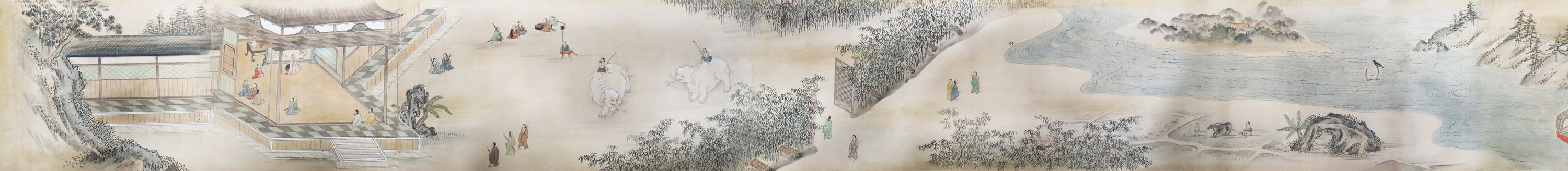
Nguyen lords's mansion in Phú Xuân in early 17th century.

In 1592, the Mạc dynasty was forced to flee to Cao Bằng and the Lê emperors were enthroned as de jure Vietnamese rulers under the leadership of Nguyễn Kim, the leader of Lê Dynasty loyalists. Later, Kim was poisoned by a Mạc Dynasty general which paved the way for his son-in-law, Trịnh Kiểm, to take over the leadership. Kim's eldest son, Nguyễn Uông, was also assassinated in order to secure Trịnh Kiểm's authority. Nguyễn Hoàng, another son of Nguyễn Kim, feared a fate like Nguyễn Uông's so he pretended to have mental illness. He asked his sister Ngoc Bao, who was a wife of Trịnh Kiểm, to entreat Kiểm to let Hoàng govern Thuận Hóa, the furthest south region of Vietnam at that time.

Because Mạc dynasty loyalists were revolting in Thuận Hóa and Trịnh Kiểm was busy fighting the Mạc dynasty forces in northern Vietnam during this time, Ngoc Bao's request was approved and Nguyễn Hoàng went south. After Hoàng pacified Thuận Hóa, he and his heir Nguyễn Phúc Nguyên serectly made this region loyal to the Nguyễn family; then they rose against the Trịnh Lords. Vietnam erupted into a new civil war between two de facto ruling families: the clan of the Nguyễn lords and the clan of the Trịnh lords.

The Nguyễn lords chose Thừa Thiên, a northern territory of Thuận Hóa, as their family seat. In 1687 during the reign of Nguyễn lord Nguyễn Phúc Trăn, the construction of a citadel was started in Phú Xuân, a village in Thừa Thiên Province. The citadel was a power symbol of Nguyễn family rather than a defensive building because the Trịnh lords' army could not breach Nguyễn lords' defense in the north regions of Phú Xuân. In 1744, Phú Xuân officially became the capital of central and southern Vietnam after Nguyễn lord Nguyễn Phúc Khoát proclaimed himseft Võ vương (Võ King or Martial King in Vietnamese). Among westerners living in the capital at this period was the Portuguese Jesuit João de Loureiro from 1752 onwards.

However, Tây Sơn rebellions broke out in 1771 and quickly occupied a large area from Quy Nhơn to Bình Thuận, thereby weakening the authority and power of the Nguyễn lords. While the war between Tây Sơn rebellion and Nguyễn lord was being fought, the Trịnh lords sent south a massive army and easily captured Phú Xuân in 1775. After the capture of Phú Xuân, the Trịnh lords' general Hoàng Ngũ Phúc made a tactical alliance with Tây Sơn and withdrew almost all troops to Tonkin and left some troops in Phú Xuân. In 1786, Tây Sơn rebellion defeated the Trịnh garrison and occupied Phú Xuân. Under the reign of emperor Quang Trung, Phú Xuân became Tây Sơn dynasty capital. In 1802, Nguyễn Ánh, a successor of the Nguyễn lords, recaptured Phú Xuân and unified the country. Nguyễn Ánh rebuilt the citadel entirely and made it the Imperial City capital of all of Vietnam.

== See also ==
- Imperial City, Huế
- Southern and Northern Dynasties (Vietnam)
