= Nguyễn Nhạc =

Founding emperor of the Tây Sơn dynasty of Vietnam (r. 1778–88)

Emperor Thái Đức 泰德帝
- Emperor of Đại Việt
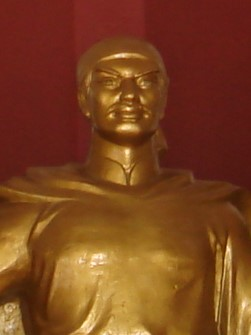

Emperor of Tây Sơn dynasty
- Reign: 1778–1788
- Predecessor: Tây Sơn dynasty established
- Successor: Quang Trung

King of Tây Sơn
- Reign: 1776–1778
- Predecessor: Lê Chiêu Thống of the Later Lê dynasty
- Successor: title changed to emperor
- Reign: 1788–1793
- Predecessor: title changed from emperor
- Successor: Nguyễn Văn Bảo
- Born: 1743; Bình Định, Đàng Trong, Đại Việt
- Died: 1793 (aged 49–50); Quy Nhơn, Đại Việt
- Spouse: Trần Thị Huệ; Ya Do
- Issue: Nguyễn Văn Bảo; Nguyễn Thanh; Nguyễn Hân; Nguyễn Dũng; Nguyễn Văn Đức; Nguyễn Văn Lương two daughters
Names
- Hồ Nhạc; Nguyễn Nhạc (阮岳); Nguyễn Văn Nhạc (阮文岳)
Era name and dates
- Thái Đức (泰德): 1778–1793
- House: Tây Sơn dynasty
- Father: Hồ Phi Phúc (or Nguyễn Phi Phúc)
- Mother: Nguyễn Thị Đồng

Nguyễn Nhạc (Vietnamese: [ŋwĩəŋ ɲâːk̚] chữ Hán: 阮岳, born 1743, died 1793) was the founder of the Tây Sơn dynasty, reigning from 1778 to 1788.

Nguyễn Nhạc and his brothers Nguyễn Lữ and Nguyễn Huệ, known as the Tây Sơn Brothers after their home district, ended the centuries-long civil war between the Trịnh Lords in northern Vietnam and the Nguyễn Lords in southern Vietnam, seizing control from these groups and the Lê dynasty. From 1778 to 1788, Nguyễn Nhạc proclaimed himself Emperor Thái Đức (Vietnamese: [tʰǎːj ɗɨ́k̚] chữ Hán: 泰德). In 1788, after his younger brother proclaimed himself Emperor Quang Trung, Nguyễn Nhạc resigned as Emperor and declared himself King of Tây Sơn.

== Early life ==
Nguyễn was born in Tây Sơn District, Quy Nhơn Province (modern Bình Định Province). Vietnamese historian Trần Trọng Kim described him as a courageous and clever man. He had two younger brothers: Nguyễn Lữ and Nguyễn Huệ. Their talents were highly appreciated by their martial arts master, Trương Văn Hiến.

The Tây Sơn brothers lived by trading betel. Legend stated that Nhạc got a magical sword from barbarians, gaining the respect of many people. Later, Nhạc became a tax collector for the Nguyễn lords. He stole all of the taxes he had collected and distributed to poor farmers. Afterwards, he fled with his brothers and became an outlaw. Hiến encouraged Nhạc to revolt against the Nguyễn, saying that: "The prophecy says: 'Revolt in the West, success in the North'. (Note: Original Vietnamese: "Tây khởi nghĩa, Bắc thu công".) You are born in Tây Sơn District, you must do your best." Nhạc agreed with him.

== Revolt against the Nguyễn lords ==
At that time, the lord of Cochinchina, Nguyễn Phúc Thuần, was young, with power resting in the hands of a corrupt regent, Trương Phúc Loan. Loan was so unpopular that people compared him with Qin Hui. There were rumors that Loan changed the former lord's will to enthrone the young prince Thuần. In 1771, the Tây Sơn brothers rebelled against Nguyễn lords. They took Tây Sơn District as their base camp, aiming to overthrow Loan and enthrone Nguyễn Phúc Dương, the eldest grandson of the former Nguyễn lord. The rebels became famous for their policy: "fair, no corruption, only looting the rich, and help the poor." (Note: Original Vietnamese: công bằng, không tham nhũng, và chỉ cướp của của người giàu, giúp người nghèo.) Soon they were widely supported by the poor. Ethnic minorities in Cochinchina, including Montagnards, Chams and Sino-Vietnamese, also took part in the rebellion.

The rebels grew rapidly and government troops were unable to put them down. One day, Nhạc sat in a prison van and ordered his men to take him to Quy Nhơn. The governor, Nguyễn Khắc Tuyên (阮克宣), was very happy, and threw him into prison. At night, Nhạc escaped from prison and opened the city gate. Quy Nhơn was taken by Tây Sơn army and used as their new base camp. Then the Tây Sơn army marched to Quảng Nam, where the Nguyễn army was defeated by the rebels. The Nguyễn sent their main forces to Quảng Nam, but failed to drive the rebels out of the province.

== Conflict with Trịnh lords ==
Hearing that Cochinchina had fallen into chaos, Trịnh Sâm, the lord of Tonkin, sent Hoàng Ngũ Phúc to attack the Nguyễn using the pretext that they were out to arrest the treacherous minister Trương Phúc Loan. The Trịnh marched south with little resistance and soon took possession of the Nguyễn capital, Phú Xuân. Nguyễn Phúc Thuần fled to Quảng Nam, where he designated Nguyễn Phúc Dương as crown prince. Several months later, when the Tây Sơn army took Quảng Nam, Thuần had to flee to Gia Định. Not long after, the country from Quảng Ngãi to Bình Thuận was occupied by Tây Sơn rebels.

The Trịnh army marched to Quảng Nam and came into conflict with the Tây Sơn. They met on the battlefield in Cẩm Sa (a place in modern Hòa Vang). Nhạc ordered Tập Đình to take the lead and set Lý Tài in the middle, with Nhạc himself to bring up the rear. Tập Đình was raided by Trịnh cavalry, which ultimately led to the Tây Sơn's defeat. Nguyễn Nhạc and Lý Tài retreated to Bến Bản. Nhạc prepared for the reception of the crown prince Dương, and went to Quy Nhơn together with him. At the same time, a Nguyễn army under Tống Phước Hiệp (宋福洽) recaptured Bình Thuận, Diên Khánh, Bình Khang (modern Ninh Hòa), and Phú Yên. The Tây Sơn army fell into a two-front war with both the Nguyễn and the Trịnh. Nhạc sent an envoy to the Trịnh army to sue for peace. Nhạc swore allegiance to the Trịnh, and in return he received the position of Tiên-phong-tướng-quân and Tây-sơn Hiệu-trưởng.

After concluding a peace deal with the Trịnh, Nhạc married his daughter to Nguyễn Phúc Dương and urged him to claim the throne, but Dương refused. Nhạc then sent a letter to Tống Phước Hiệp in which he said he had decided to swear allegiance to the crown prince Dương and was prepared to capture the capital Phú Xuân. Nhạc then ordered Nguyễn Huệ to launch a raid on the Nguyễn army. Hợp was defeated and fled to Vân Phong.

The Trịnh army marched to Quảng Ngãi, but most of its soldiers died from disease and Hoàng Ngũ Phúc had to retreat. Phúc died of illness on his way back to Phú Xuân; his assistant, Bùi Thế Đạt, was appointed as the successor. Quảng Nam was reoccupied by the Tây Sơn army; now, Nhạc could concentrate on fighting against the Nguyễn. He sent Nguyễn Lữ to the south. Nguyễn Phúc Thuần was defeated and fled to Biên Hòa.

== Establishment of Tây Sơn dynasty ==
In 1776, Nhạc titled himself Tây Sơn vương (西山王 "king of Tây Sơn"). He used Đồ Bàn Citadel (Vijaya) as the capital, and appointed many officials. Nguyễn Phúc Dương was imprisoned in a Buddhist temple; later, he fled to Gia Định, where he was supported by Lý Tài and ascended to the Nguyễn throne. In the next year, Nguyễn Nhạc was recognized as the new ruler of Cochinchina by Trịnh Sâm. He received the noble rank Cung-quận-công (恭郡公 "provincial duke Cung") from the Trịnh lord. The Tây Sơn army marched further south, and both Nguyễn Phúc Thuần and Nguyễn Phúc Dương were captured and executed by Nguyễn Huệ. In 1778, Nhạc crowned himself emperor, and changed the era name to "Thái Đức" (泰德), marking the establishment of the Tây Sơn dynasty.

A nephew of Thuần, Nguyễn Ánh, managed to escape to Hà Tiên, then to Poulo Panjang. In late 1777, the main part of the Tây Sơn army left Saigon and marched north. Nguyễn Ánh landed in Long Xuyên. There he was supported by many Nguyễn generals and raised the flag of restoration. Đỗ Thanh Nhơn, the leader of Đông Sơn Army, also swore allegiance to Ánh. The Nguyễn army became much stronger and captured many places. Ánh also made an alliance with Siam. However, the assassination of Đỗ Thanh Nhơn by Nguyễn Ánh caused the Đông Sơn Army to rebel, thus badly weakening the Nguyễn army. Taking this opportunity, Nguyễn Nhạc and Nguyễn Huệ invaded Gia Định and finally recaptured it in 1782. Nhạc returned to Quy Nhơn. In the next year, Châu Văn Tiếp, a supporter of the Nguyễn, defeated the Tây Sơn garrison in Saigon and invited Nguyễn Ánh to return. Nguyễn Lữ and Nguyễn Huệ were sent to Gia Định and forced Ánh to flee to Phú Quốc. In 1785, Huệ defeated Nguyễn Ánh and the Siamese navy at the Battle of Rạch Gầm-Xoài Mút. Ánh had to flee to Siam.

== Nguyễn Huệ's overthrow of the Trịnh ==
The ruler of Tonkin, Trịnh Sâm, died in 1782. His favorite son Trịnh Cán ascended to the throne but was soon deposed in a military coup. The mutinying soldiers installed Trịnh Khải as the new lord. Tonkin fell into chaos. In 1786, an army under Nguyễn Huệ, Vũ Văn Nhậm and Nguyễn Hữu Chỉnh marched north to attack Phú Xuân. After the capture of Phú Xuân, Chỉnh encouraged Huệ to overthrow the Trịnh. Huệ took his advice, marched further north without Nguyễn Nhạc's order, and finally captured Thăng Long. Nhạc did not want to take Tonkin and sent an envoy to Phú Xuân to prevent Huệ from marching north, but Huệ had already left. Then he got the message that Huệ had captured Thăng Long, and realized that Huệ was not easily controlled. Nhạc led 2,500 men and marched north to meet with Huệ and the Lê emperor. In Thăng Long, Nhạc promised that he would not take any territory from Tonkin. Then he retreated from Tonkin together with Huệ. Nguyễn Nhạc proclaimed himself as Trung ương Hoàng đế (中央皇帝 "the Central Emperor"). Nguyễn Lữ was given the title Đông Định vương (東定王 "King of Eastern Conquering"), with Gia Định as his fief; Nguyễn Huệ received the title Bắc Bình Vương (北平王 "King of Northern Conquering") and lived in Phú Xuân, with the area north of Hải Vân as his fief.

== Civil war between two brothers ==
Not long after, Nguyễn Nhạc came into conflict with Nguyễn Huệ. A civil war broke out, and Huệ besieged Quy Nhơn for several months. The main forces of Gia Định were called back to support Nhạc, but were defeated in Phú Yên, with its commander Đặng Văn Chân surrendering to Huệ. Nhạc climbed onto the city wall and shouted to Huệ: "How can you use the pot of skin to cook meat like that?". (Note: Original Vietnamese: "Nỡ lòng nào lại nồi da nấu thịt như thế?", Original Sino-Vietnamese: "Bì oa chử nhục, đệ tâm hà nhẫn?") It was an old custom that if hunters caught prey in the jungle and were without a pot, they would flay the animal and use its skin to cook its meat. Using this metaphor, Nhạc indicated that brothers should not fight with each other. Huệ was moved to tears, decided to retreat, and reached a peace agreement Nhạc. They chose Bến Bản as a boundary; the area north of Quảng Ngãi was Huệ's; the area south of Thăng Bình and Điện Bàn belonged to Nhạc. From then on they ceased warring with each other.

== Final years ==
Later, Nguyễn Huệ marched north and put down the rebellion in Tonkin. Huệ proclaimed himself as Emperor Quang Trung in 1788 and defeated a Qing intervention in the Battle of Ngọc Hồi-Đống Đa. Meanwhile, the civil war between the Tây Sơn brothers had provided Nguyễn Ánh with the chance to go back to Cochinchina again. Nhạc's territory was eroded by the Nguyễn lord. During his final years, he only controlled three provinces: Quy Nhơn (modern Bình Định), Quảng Ngãi and Phú Yên. He was described as "an old man who is resigned to the present state of affairs" by Nguyễn Huệ. Huệ was also worried about the future of the Tây Sơn dynasty.

Nguyễn Huệ suddenly died in 1792. Nhạc prepared to attend Huệ's funeral, but when the road to Phú Xuân was blocked by Huệ's successor Nguyễn Quang Toản, he had to return and send a sister to attend the funeral. In the next year, Quy Nhơn was attacked by the Nguyễn. When the Nguyễn navy reached Thị Nại Port, Nhạc ordered his crown prince Nguyễn Văn Bảo to fight against them. The Tây Sơn navy suffered from a double-pronged attack, and Bảo was defeated by Tôn Thất Hội (尊室會), Võ Tính, Nguyễn Huỳnh Đức and Nguyễn Văn Thành, and fled back to Quy Nhơn. Nhạc had to ask for Nguyễn Quang Toản's help. 17,000 men under Phạm Công Hưng, Ngô Văn Sở, Nguyễn Văn Huấn (阮文訓) and Lê Trung (黎忠) marched south to reinforce Quy Nhơn. A navy led by Đặng Văn Chân was also sent there at the same time. The Nguyễn army had to retreat. Hưng marched into the city, claiming that the emperor of Phú Xuân had taken over it. Nhạc was angry, and died soon after suffering from vomiting blood.

== The fate of his offspring ==
Nhạc's eldest son, Nguyễn Văn Bảo, was stripped of his position by Nguyễn Quang Toản and granted the title Hiếu công (孝公, "Duke of filial piety"). The Nhạc's was annexed by Toản, with Bảo only receiving Phù Ly (modern Phù Mỹ and Phù Cát) as his fief. In 1798, Bảo launched an unsuccessful rebellion against Toản and was executed.

The Tây Sơn dynasty was overthrown by Nguyễn Ánh in 1802. Nhạc's three sons, Nguyễn Thanh (阮清), Nguyễn Hân (阮昕) and Nguyễn Dũng (阮勇), were executed together with Nguyễn Quang Toản and other princes of Tây Sơn dynasty. The tombs of Nguyễn Nhạc and Nguyễn Huệ were razed to the ground and their remains were dug out and crushed into ashes. The skulls of Nguyễn Nhạc, Nguyễn Huệ, and Huệ's wife were locked up in prison in perpetuity. It was said that Nguyễn Huệ had desecrated the tombs of Nguyễn lords before, so Nguyễn Ánh did this to get "revenge for the ancestors" (爲九世而復讎).

Two other sons, Nguyễn Văn Đức (阮文德) and Nguyễn Văn Lương (阮文良), and grandson Nguyễn Văn Đâu (阮文兜, son of Nguyễn Văn Đức) escaped and hid in countryside. In 1831, they were found by the Nguyễn dynasty and executed by waist chop.

== Notes ==
Nguyễn Nhạc Tây Sơn dynasty Born: ? Died: 1793
Regnal titles
Preceded by Tây Sơn dynasty established	Emperor of Đại Việt; 1778–1788	Succeeded by Quang Trung
