= Châu Văn Tiếp =

Vietnamese general (1738–1784)

- Born: 1738; Phú Yên, Vietnam
- Died: 1784 (aged 45–46); Vĩnh Long, Vietnam
- Military career
- Allegiance: Nguyễn lords
- Service years: 1773–1784
- Rank: General

Châu Văn Tiếp (朱文接, 1738–1784), born Châu Doãn Ngạnh (朱尹梗), was an 18th-century Vietnamese military commander, best known for his role as a general of Nguyễn Ánh.

== Early life ==
Born in 1738, Châu Văn Tiếp was a son of a horse merchant from Phú Yên, on the southern coast of Vietnam. When Tiep was young, he mastered the martial arts and could speak both Siamese and Khmer.

== Military career ==
In 1773, the Tây Sơn brothers revolted, so Châu Văn Tiếp and his family went into hiding in Hà Duy, remote mountains in Phú Yên province. In Hà Duy, Tiếp gathered an army of natives and occupied the Tra Lon mountain surrounding the area.

The Tây Sơn leader Nguyễn Nhạc invited Tiep to help him under the name of the Nguyễn prince Nguyen Phuc Duong and Tiếp agreed. Shortly thereafter, Tiếp defected from the Tây Sơn army and joined the Nguyễn lords. The Nguyễn governor of Long Ho (Note: present day Vĩnh Long Province) appointed him the governor of Phú Yên and Bình Thuận.

In 1777, Tiếp led an army marched north in order to reinforce the armies of the two Nguyễn Lords Nguyễn Phúc Thuần and Nguyen Phuc Duong, who were being pursued by Tây Sơn army. However, the Tây Sơn army defeated Tiếp and forced him to flee along with Nguyễn Lords. Later, Tiếp led his supporters back to their base in Tra Lon so that they stayed away from the conflict of Lý Tài and Đỗ Thanh Nhơn.

Later, the two Nguyễn lords and almost all of their family members were captured and executed by Tây Sơn; the most senior surviving member was Nguyễn Ánh, the 15-year-old nephew of Nguyễn Phúc Thuần. When Nguyễn Ánh returned from hiding in the Mekong Delta jungle, Tiep joined the Nguyễn loyalists. In 1780, Nguyễn Ánh proclaimed himself Nguyễn vương and gave Tiep the position "Khâm Sai Đại Đô Đốc" (King's Grand General).

In 1781, Nguyễn Ánh ordered Châu Văn Tiếp to lead an attack against the Tây Sơn in Diên Khánh. Again, Tiếp was defeated and fled to Phú Yên. After learning of the fall of Gia Dinh, he led an army whose banner was embroidered with the four words "Lương Sơn Tá Quốc" (lit. local heroes who want to save the country) and marched toward Gia Dinh to reinforce Nguyễn Ánh. Tiếp defeated the Tây Sơn garrison in Saigon and invited Nguyễn Ánh, who had been hiding on Phú Quốc island to return. Shortly thereafter, the Tây Sơn attacked again and the Nguyễn army was defeated decisively; Chau Van Tiep himself fled to Siam and requested the aid of king Buddha Yodfa Chulaloke and the king agreed.

== Death and burial ==
In 1784, after the meeting with Nguyễn Ánh, Siam sent an army consisting of between 20,000 and 30,000 troops and 300 ships to help. Along with the Siamese army, Châu Văn Tiếp led a small Vietnamese army and navy. While Tiếp's army was fighting against the Tây Sơn in Man Thit, Vĩnh Long, a Tây Sơn soldier named Bảo stabbed Tiếp in the back and killed him.

Because of the ongoing war with Tây Sơn, Nguyễn Ánh temporarily buried Tiếp in Vĩnh Long. After unifying Vietnam and founding the Nguyễn dynasty, Nguyễn Ánh (now called Gia Long) reburied Tiếp in Vũng Tàu and posthumously bestowed upon him the title of Quận Công (Duke). Afterwards, Tiếp was posthumously honored by the emperor Minh Mạng and the emperor Tự Đức, both descendants of Gia Long.

== In popular culture ==
Châu Văn Tiếp, along with Đỗ Thanh Nhơn and Võ Tánh, was called "Gia Định Tam Hùng" (Three Heroes of Gia Định) in Vietnamese folk culture.

== Notes ==
Footnote

Citations
