= Nguyễn Văn Bảo =

Vietnamese prince of Tây Sơn dynasty

- Hiếu công

Ruler of Small Court
- Reign: 1793–1798
- Predecessor: Nguyễn Nhạc
- Successor: none
- Born: 1776; Quy Nhơn, Đại Việt
- Died: 1798 (aged 21–22); Phú Xuân, Đại Việt
Names
- Nguyễn Văn Bảo (阮文寶)
Regnal name
- Hiếu công (孝公)
- House: Tây Sơn dynasty
- Father: Nguyễn Nhạc
- Mother: Trần Thị Huệ

Nguyễn Văn Bảo (阮文寶, 1776–1798) or Nguyễn Bảo (阮寶), was a prince of Tây Sơn dynasty, Vietnam.

Bảo was the eldest son of Nguyễn Nhạc. His mother was Trần Thị Huệ. After Nguyễn Nhạc ascended the throne, he was designated as Crown Prince.

In 1793, Quy Nhơn was attacked by Nguyễn lord. When Nguyễn navy reached Thị Nại Port, Bảo was ordered to fight against them. Tây Sơn navy suffered from a double-pronged attack, Bảo was defeated by Tôn Thất Hội, Võ Tính, Nguyễn Huỳnh Đức and Nguyễn Văn Thành, and fled back to Quy Nhơn. Nguyễn Nhạc had to ask for Nguyễn Quang Toản's help. Phạm Công Hưng led troops to reinforce Quy Nhơn together with Ngô Văn Sở, Nguyễn Văn Huấn and Lê Trung. A navy led by Đặng Văn Chân was also sent there in the same time. Nguyễn army had to retreat. Hưng marched into the city, claiming that the emperor of Phú Xuân had taken over it. Nhạc was angry, and died soon after suffering from vomiting blood.

Bảo was stripped of his position as Crown Prince, and granted the title Hiếu công (孝公, "Duke of filial piety") by his cousin Nguyễn Quang Toản. He received Phù Ly (modern Phù Mỹ and Phù Cát) as his fief, and was called tiểu triều (小朝, "small court") by Tây Sơn dynasty. Bùi Đắc Trụ, an officer of Toản, was left in Quy Nhơn to watch him. Bùi Đắc Trụ was replaced by Nguyễn Văn Huấn, then by Lê Trung. Bảo was resentful, he colluded with Nguyễn Ánh, and planned to revolt against Tây Sơn dynasty. In 1798, he revolted against Tây Sơn dynasty in Lê Trung's absence, and surrendered to Nguyễn lord. Getting the information, an army under Nguyễn Văn Thành was sent to assist him. Before the army reach, Quy Nhơn was recaptured by Tây Sơn dynasty again. Bảo was captured and transferred to Phú Xuân. There, he was executed.
