= Tập Đình =

Vietnamese general during the Tây Sơn Rebellion

Tập Đình (chữ Hán: 集亭, ?–?) was a general during the Tây Sơn Rebellion.

He was born Li A-chi (李阿集) in Chaozhou, Guangdong, Qing China. He went to Qui Nhơn in 1759, and became a merchant there. After the Tây Sơn Rebellion broke out, he organized an army named Trung Nghĩa Quân (忠義軍, Loyal Army) to join in the rebellion. He was granted the title Tập Đình Hầu (集亭侯, Marquess of Tập Đình), which later became his nickname. The members in this army wore their hair in the Manchu style, though some of them weren't Chinese. In battles, they were drunk and bare-chested, and combated bravery.

The army of Trịnh lord marched south in 1775. Tập Đình fought against Trịnh's army together with Lý Tài and Nguyễn Nhạc, but was defeated in Cẩm Sa (a place in modern Hòa Vang District, Quảng Nam Province). After that, Nhạc turned to swear allegiance to Trịnh lord.

Tập Đình was described as "a man showed a propensity for violence, and hard to be controlled". Nhạc regarded him as a big threat and planned to kill him. Noticing this, Tập Đình fled back to Guangdong. Later, he was captured by the Viceroy of Liangguang, and executed.
