= Đỗ Thanh Nhơn =

Vietnamese commander (died 1781)

- Born: Unknown; Southern Vietnam
- Died: 1781; Saigon, Vietnam
- Military career
- Allegiance: Nguyễn lords
- Service years: ?-1781
- Rank: General

Vietnamese name
- Vietnamese: Đỗ Thanh Nhơn
- Hán-Nôm: 杜清仁

Đỗ Thanh Nhơn (died 1781) was an 18th-century Vietnamese military commander.

== Early life ==
Details of Nhơn's early life are unknown except that he was a low-ranking naval officer of lord Nguyễn Phúc Thuần.

== The Dong Son army ==
In the early 1770s, the Tây Sơn revolt broke out and quickly occupied a large part of the Nguyễn Lords’ territory, in the southern half of modern-day Vietnam. Moreover, the Trịnh lords, who ruled the northern half of the country, sent a large army to attack, which forced Lord Nguyễn Phúc Thuần to flee to Trấn Biên (present-day Đồng Nai). The Tây Sơn kept pursuing Nguyễn Phúc Thuần and forced him to call for reinforcements from the Nguyễn garrison in Saigon, but the Nguyễn governor of Saigon could not send his reinforcements in time. This situation gave Đỗ Thanh Nhơn the chance to aid the Nguyễn lord.

In 1775, under the banner of the Nguyễn lords, Nhơn proclaimed himself Đông Sơn Thượng Tướng Quân ("Eastern Mountain High General") and gathered an army of 3,000 men, called the Đông Sơn army. (Note: Đông Sơn means Eastern Mountain in Vietnamese. Đông Sơn army took this name to declare themselves enemy of Tây Sơn army ('Tây Sơn' means Western Mountain in Vietnamese).) Then, Nhơn led his forces in attacking the Tây Sơn and drove them out of Saigon in 1776. After capturing Gia Dinh, Nhơn invited the Nguyễn lord Nguyễn Phúc Thuần back and was highly rewarded. Thereafter, Nhơn conflicted with Lý Tài, an ethnic Chinese mercenary general of the Nguyễn army, and was forced to flee to Bến Tre where he set up a defensive position.

In midspring of 1777, the Tây Sơn defeated the Nguyễn and captured Saigon. Meanwhile, Lý Tài fled and was captured and killed by Nhon's men. Afterwards, Nhon and his army rejoined the Nguyễn. The Tây Sơn kept pursuing the Nguyễn and they captured and executed two Nguyễn lords, Nguyễn Phúc Thuần and Nguyen Phuc Duong and almost all the Nguyễn descendants except a few, including Nguyễn Ánh, the 15-year-old nephew of Nguyễn Phúc Thuần.

After the killing of the Nguyễns, Nguyễn Huệ, one of the three Tây Sơn brothers withdrew his troops to the north, leaving a small army in Saigon. In 1778, taking advantage of the absence of the Tây Sơn's main force, Nguyễn Ánh and Nhơn led an army of Nguyễn loyalists in attacking and recapturing Saigon. Afterwards, Nguyễn Ánh re-established the family's authority in Saigon and proclaimed himseft Đại nguyên súy (Commander-in-chief) of the Nguyễn clan. The following year, Nhơn expelled further Tây Sơn troops from the surrounding provinces of Gia Định, and inflicted heavy losses on the Tây Sơn naval fleet. Taking advantage of the more favourable situation, Nguyễn Ánh sent a diplomatic mission to Siam to propose a treaty of friendship. However, this pact was derailed in 1779 when the Cambodians held an uprising against their pro-Siamese leader, Ang Non. Nguyễn Ánh sent Đỗ Thanh Nhơn to help the uprising, which saw Ang Non defeated decisively and executed. Nhơn returned to Saigon with high honour and concentrated his efforts on improving the Nguyễn navy.

In 1780, Nguyễn Ánh proclaimed himself Nguyễn vương (Nguyễn king or Nguyễn ruler) and Nhơn became "Ngoại hữu, Phụ chính, Thượng tướng công", the second most-powerful position in the Nguyễn army.

== Death ==
In 1781, Nguyễn Ánh pretended to be ill and asked Đỗ Thanh Nhơn to visit him. Unaware of his leader's trap, Nhơn came to the palace and was killed by Nguyễn Ánh's bodyguards. The reason for this assassination remains unclear, but it was postulated that Nguyễn Ánh did so because Nhon's fame and military success was overshadowing him.

Although Nguyễn Ánh foresaw the rebellion of Đỗ Thanh Nhơn's supporters following their leader's assassination, he could not prevent it, thus badly weakening the Nguyễn army. Moreover, Nhơn's death also led to the recapture of Saigon by the Tây Sơn rebels shortly thereafter because Nhơn was the Nguyễn officer that they feared the most and the forces were disunited following his death.

== In popular culture ==
Nhơn, along with Châu Văn Tiếp and Võ Tánh, was called "Gia Định Tam Hùng" (Three Heroes of Gia Định) in Vietnamese folk culture.

== Notes ==
Footnote

Citations
