= Hoàng Ngũ Phúc =

Hoàng Ngũ Phúc (chữ Hán: 黃五福, 1713–1776) was a general and eunuch during the Revival Lê dynasty in Vietnam.

Phúc took part in putting down rebellions of Nguyễn Hữu Cầu, Hoàng Công Chất, Nguyễn Danh Phương, and Lê Duy Mật.

Later, Phúc attacked Nguyễn lord in the Trịnh–Nguyễn War in 1774. At first, Nguyễn Nhạc, the leader of Tây Sơn rebels, swore allegiance to Nguyễn Phúc Dương (a Nguyễn prince). After Phúc defeated Nhạc in Cẩm Sa in the Tây Sơn–Nguyễn lords War, Nhạc turned to swear allegiance to Trịnh lord. In the next year, Trịnh army occupied Phú Xuân (modern Huế) and captured Trương Phúc Loan, the regent of Nguyễn lord. Phúc was appointed as the viceroy of Thuận Hoá by Trịnh Sâm. He decided to march further south, but most of his army died from disease, so he had to retreat. He died of illness on his way back to Phú Xuân. Bùi Thế Đạt was appointed as his successor.

Many generals and officials were his disciples, including Hoàng Đình Bảo (also his adoptive son), Hoàng Đình Thể, Hoàng Phùng Cơ, Đinh Tích Nhưỡng, and Nguyễn Hữu Chỉnh.
