= Trương Phúc Loan =

Trương Phúc Loan (chữ Hán: 張福巒, ?–1776) was a mandarin who served under the reign of two Nguyễn lords: Nguyễn Phúc Khoát and Nguyễn Phúc Thuần.

In 1765, Nguyễn Phúc Khoát died, and appointed his second son Nguyễn Phúc Luân as successor. But Loan changed the lord's will and throned Nguyễn Phúc Thuần the new lord. Then, Luân was imprisoned and murdered.

Trương Phúc Loan served as regent during Nguyễn Phúc Thuần's reign. He was so unpopular that people compared him with Qin Hui (秦檜), a chancellor of the Song China, so he got the nickname "Trương Tần Cối" (張秦檜). In order to remove Trương Phúc Loan, Tây Sơn brothers rebelled in 1771, and they said they would enthrone Nguyễn Phúc Dương, the eldest grandson of Khoát. Southern Vietnam felt into chaos. Hearing the news, Trịnh Sâm, the lord of northern Vietnam, sent Hoàng Ngũ Phúc marched south in 1774, using the excuse that they would help Nguyễn lord to arrest the treacherous minister Trương Phúc Loan. When Trịnh army reached Phú Xuân, Loan was arrested by Nguyễn officials and presented to Trịnh army. He was taken to Thang Long, and died on the halfway.
