= Lý Tài =

Lý Tài (chữ Hán: 李才, Wade–Giles: Li Tsai, ?–1777) was a general during the Tây Sơn Rebellion.

Lý was a Chinese merchant. After the Tay Son rebellion broke out, he organized an army named Hòa Nghĩa Quân (和義軍, "Harmony Army") to join in the rebellion. All members of this army were from Qing China in Chinese costume.

The Trịnh lords, who ruled the northern half of the country, sent a large army to attack in 1775, which forced Nguyen king Nguyễn Phúc Thuần to flee to Quảng Nam. Nguyễn Phúc Dương, who was the crown prince of Nguyen, was captured by Lý Tài, and taken to Hội An. Dương was used by Tay Son rebels to gain popularity among Southern Vietnamese.

The Tay Son army was defeated by Trinh lord in Cẩm Sa (a place in modern Hòa Vang District, Quảng Nam). Meanwhile, Nguyễn Phúc Thuần entrenched himself in the south and tried to regain the lost territory. Nguyễn Nhạc had to be reconciled with Trinh, and directed their fire at Nguyen lord, forcing Thuần to flee to Long Xuyên.

Nguyễn Phúc Dương escaped and fled to Gia Dinh (modern-day Ho Chi Minh City) in 1776, and Lý Tài betrayed Tay Son army at the same time. He installed Dương as the new Nguyen lord and was granted a title named Bảo giá đại tướng quân (chữ Hán: 保駕大將軍, the great general who escorts the king) by Dương.

Lý Tài came into conflict with another important general Đỗ Thanh Nhơn, and forced him to flee to Vĩnh Long (in modern-day Bến Tre). Nhơn set up a defensive position there. In the midspring of 1777, the Tây Sơn defeated the Nguyễn and captured Gia Dinh. Lý Tài fled and was captured and killed by Đỗ Thanh Nhơn.
