= Hòa Vang =

Hòa Vang Xã Hòa Vang
- Rural commune
- Hòa Vang commune
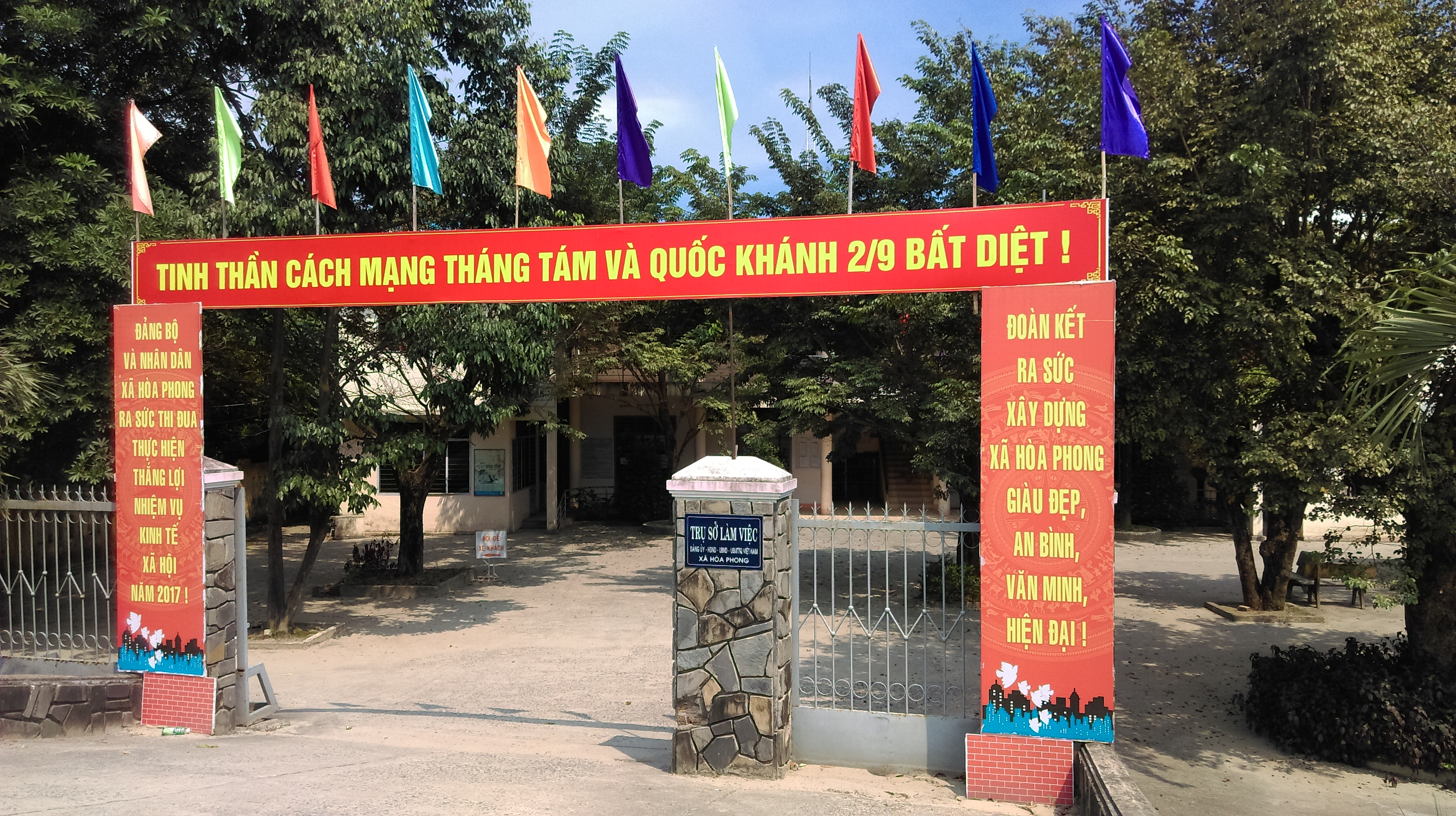
- Hòa Phong commune People's Committee

- Seal
- Interactive map of Hòa Vang
- Coordinates: 15°59′00″N 108°03′40″E
- Country: Vietnam
- Region: Mekong Delta
- Municipality: Da Nang
- Time zone: UTC+7 (UTC + 7)
- Website: http://hoavang.danang.gov.vn/

Hòa Vang is a rural commune (xã) of Da Nang, Vietnam. It is one of the 93 new wards, communes and special zones of the city following the reorganization in 2025.

On June 16, 2025, the Standing Committee of the National Assembly issued Resolution No. 1667/NQ-UBTVQH15 on the arrangement of commune-level administrative units in Đà Nẵng in 2025. Accordingly, the entire natural area and population of Hòa Phong Commune and Hòa Phú Commune (formerly in Hòa Vang district of Đà Nẵng) were merged to form a new commune named Hòa Vang Commune.
