= Nguyễn Phúc Khoát =

Nguyen lord (1714–1765)

Nguyễn Phúc Khoát 阮福濶
- King; Lord of Cochinchina

Nguyễn Lords/King of Nguyễn (阮王)
- Reign: 1738–1765
- Predecessor: Nguyễn Phúc Trú
- Successor: Nguyễn Phúc Thuần
- Born: 26 September 1714
- Died: 7 July 1765 (aged 50); Cochinchina
- Spouse: Trương Thị Dung; Trần Thị Xạ; Nguyễn Phúc Ngọc Cầu
- Issue: Nguyễn Phúc Chương; Nguyễn Phúc Luân (father of Gia Long); Nguyễn Phúc Hạo (father of Nguyễn Phúc Dương); Nguyễn Phúc Thuần
Names
- Nguyễn Phúc Khoát (阮福濶)
Regnal name
- Võ Vương (武王)
Posthumous name
- Kiền Cương Uy Đoán thần Nghị Thánh Du Nhân Từ Duệ Trí Hiếu Vũ Hoàng Đế 乾剛威斷神毅聖猷仁慈睿智孝武皇帝
Temple name
- Thế Tông (世宗)
- House: Nguyễn Phúc
- Father: Nguyễn Phúc Chú
- Mother: Trương Thị Thư
- Religion: Buddhism

Nguyễn Phúc Khoát (26 September 1714 – 7 July 1765) was one of the Nguyễn lords who ruled over the southern portion of Vietnam from the 16th-18th centuries. Also known as Chúa Võ (主武) or Võ vương (武王) (roughly Martial King), he continued the southern expansion undertaken by his predecessor, Nguyễn Phúc Trú. Provinces and districts originally belonging to Cambodia were taken by Khoát. The Vietnamese-Cambodian border established by the end of his reign remains the border today. The de jure pretense of loyalty to the Lê dynasty was performed by Khoát.

In 1747, Khoát sent a number of Vietnamese warriors to aid rebel princes of Cambodia against the newly crowned Cambodian King Ang Tong. These forces seized Sóc Trăng town and then moved towards Oudong, then royal capital of Cambodia. Ang Tong requested aid from Mạc Thiên Tứ, who secured a truce with the Nguyễn lord, in exchange for a few more provinces, namely Gò Công and Tân An. Ten years later, the Cambodian throne was seized by Outey II, with the help of Nguyễn and Mạc. In return for their contributions, he granted them seven provinces, including Sóc Trăng, Trà Vinh, Kampot, and Kompong Som.

Nguyễn Phúc Khoát died in 1765, and was succeeded by his sixteenth son, Nguyễn Phúc Thuần. The presumed heir was originally his second son Nguyễn Phúc Chương. After his death, his demise was taken advantage of by the Tây Sơn and its subsequent rebellion later in 1778.

== Culture ==
Trousers and tunics on the Chinese pattern in 1774 were ordered by the Võ vương Emperor to replace the traditional Vietnamese skirt of women. However, Han-Chinese clothing are assembled by several pieces of clothing including both pants and skirts called quần (裙) or thường (裳) which is a part of Hanfu garments throughout the history of Han Chinese clothing. The Chinese Han, Tang and Ming dynasty clothing was referred to by Nguyễn Phúc Khoát.

Missionaries and Christianity were banned by Nguyễn Phúc Khoát in 1750, however he did listened to music by western missionaries.

== Sources ==
- Coedes, G. (1962). The Making of South-east Asia. London: Cox & Wyman Ltd. p213.

Vietnamese royalty
Preceded by Nguyễn Phúc Trú	Nguyễn lord Lord of Cochinchina; 1738–1765	Succeeded by Nguyễn Phúc Thuần
