= Võ Tánh =

- Born: 1768; Biên Hòa or Đồng Nai, Vietnam
- Died: 1801 (aged 32–33); Bình Định, Vietnam
- Burial place: Phú Nhuận, Ho Chi Minh City
- Military career
- Allegiance: Kiến Hòa Army; Nguyễn Lords
- Service years: 1781-1801
- Rank: General
- Conflicts: The Siege of Quy Nhơn (1800-1801)

Võ Tánh (武 性, 1768—1801) was an 18th-century Vietnamese military commander, best known for his role as a general of Nguyễn Ánh, who unified modern-day Vietnam and ruled as Emperor Gia Long.

== Early life ==
Võ Tánh was born in Phước Tinh Village, in what was then Bà Rịa (present day Biên Hòa and Đồng Nai). Tanh's elder brother, Võ Nhàn, was a follower and a general of Đỗ Thanh Nhơn, an officer in the Nguyễn army.

== Kiến Hòa army ==
In 1781, when Đỗ Thanh Nhơn was assassinated by his own leader, Nguyễn Ánh, Võ Tánh and his brother, Võ Nhàn, revolted and occupied Hóc Môn, a village on the northern outskirts of Saigon. Afterwards, the rebels moved to Gò Công and built their base there. At that time, Võ Tánh's army, called the Kiến Hòa army, grew to a force of 10,000 men.

Meanwhile, Nguyễn Ánh was badly defeated at the Battle of Rạch Gầm-Xoài Mút and fled to Siam which made the Kiến Hòa army the only rival of the Tây Sơn in the Gia Định region. In 1787, Nguyễn Ánh returned to Gia Định from Siam and began attacking the Tây Sơn. When Nguyễn Ánh was preparing his march to Saigon, he offered to make an alliance with the Kiến Hòa army, but Võ Tánh refused.

== General for Nguyễn Ánh ==
The next year, in 1788, Võ Tánh decided to join Nguyễn Ánh's side and integrated his entire army into the Nguyễn army. Later, Nguyễn Ánh bestowed Võ Tánh the position of Khâm sai Chưởng Cơ Tiên Phong Doanh(欽差掌奇先鋒營 - Imperial Commissioner, Vanguard Regiment Commander) and married off his sister, princess Ngọc Du, to the commander.

In 1789, Tánh forced the Tây Sơn general Pham Van Tham, who was the general-in-chief of the Tây Sơn garrison in southern Vietnam, to surrender to the Nguyễn army, which marked the end of Tây Sơn rule in Gia Định. Later in 1790, Võ Tánh led an army that captured the citadel of Diên Khánh.

In 1793, Nguyễn Ánh launched the first expedition to Quy Nhơn. While the Nguyễn army was fighting against the Tây Sơn army in the surrounding area, Nguyễn Ánh appointed Võ Tánh Khâm Sai Quản Soái Hậu Quân Doanh, Bình Tây Tham Thắng Tướng Quân Hộ Giá (欽差管帥後管營, 平西參勝將軍護駕 - Imperial Commissioner, Managing General of the Army Logistics & Protectorate General to Victoriously Pacify the West). Then, in 1793, Nguyễn Ánh built a citadel in Diên Khánh and appointed Võ Tánh as the governor of the city.

Shortly thereafter, Võ Tánh returned to Gia Định, where he was elevated to the position of Đại Tướng Quân ("Grand General") and was given the title Quận Công (lit., "Duke"). In 1797, Tánh assisted Nguyễn Ánh in launching a seaborne attack on Quảng Nam, where they quickly defeated the Tây Sơn garrison and occupied the province.

In 1799, Nguyễn Ánh launched the third expedition to Quy Nhơn. The expedition was successful, and Nguyễn Ánh captured the Citadel of Quy Nhơn and renamed the fortress town Bình Định (lit., "Pacified"). Afterwards, Nguyễn Ánh appointed Võ Tánh as the new governor of the city and withdrew his main forces to Saigon.

== The Siege of Quy Nhơn ==
In early 1800, two senior Tây Sơn generals, Tran Quang Dieu and Vu Van Dung, led a large force consisting of army and naval units toward Quy Nhơn with a view to recapturing it.

The Tây Sơn swiftly occupied the territory surrounding the Citadel of Quy Nhơn, including the vital Thị Nại Port. Then, they set up a solid defensive system and besieged the citadel. Besides the military tactics, Tây Sơn commanders applied a psychological tactic that made the former Tây Sơn soldiers who were now serving in Nguyễn forces to defect and return to the Tây Sơn army. The tactic succeeded, forcing Võ Tánh to seal the citadel's door and wait for reinforcements.

Although Nguyễn Ánh immediately led a force northwards to Quy Nhơn in order to relieve Võ Tánh's besieged forces, the Nguyễn reinforcements could not break the Tây Sơn encirclement and a long battle resulted. Acknowledging the poor situation, Nguyễn Ánh ordered Võ Tánh to abandon the citadel, but Võ Tánh rejected and suggested that he would pin the main Tây Sơn force down there so that Nguyễn Ánh could attack their Citadel of Phú Xuân. Nguyễn Ánh agreed and then he attacked and captured Phú Xuân, forcing Tây Sơn emperor Quang Toan to flee to northern Vietnam. This victory was a turning point of the war, from which the Tây Sơn became very weak and never posed any other significant threat to Nguyễn Ánh. The siege of Quy Nhơn continued for over a year to June 1801, when the citadel's food provisions were exhausted.

== Death ==
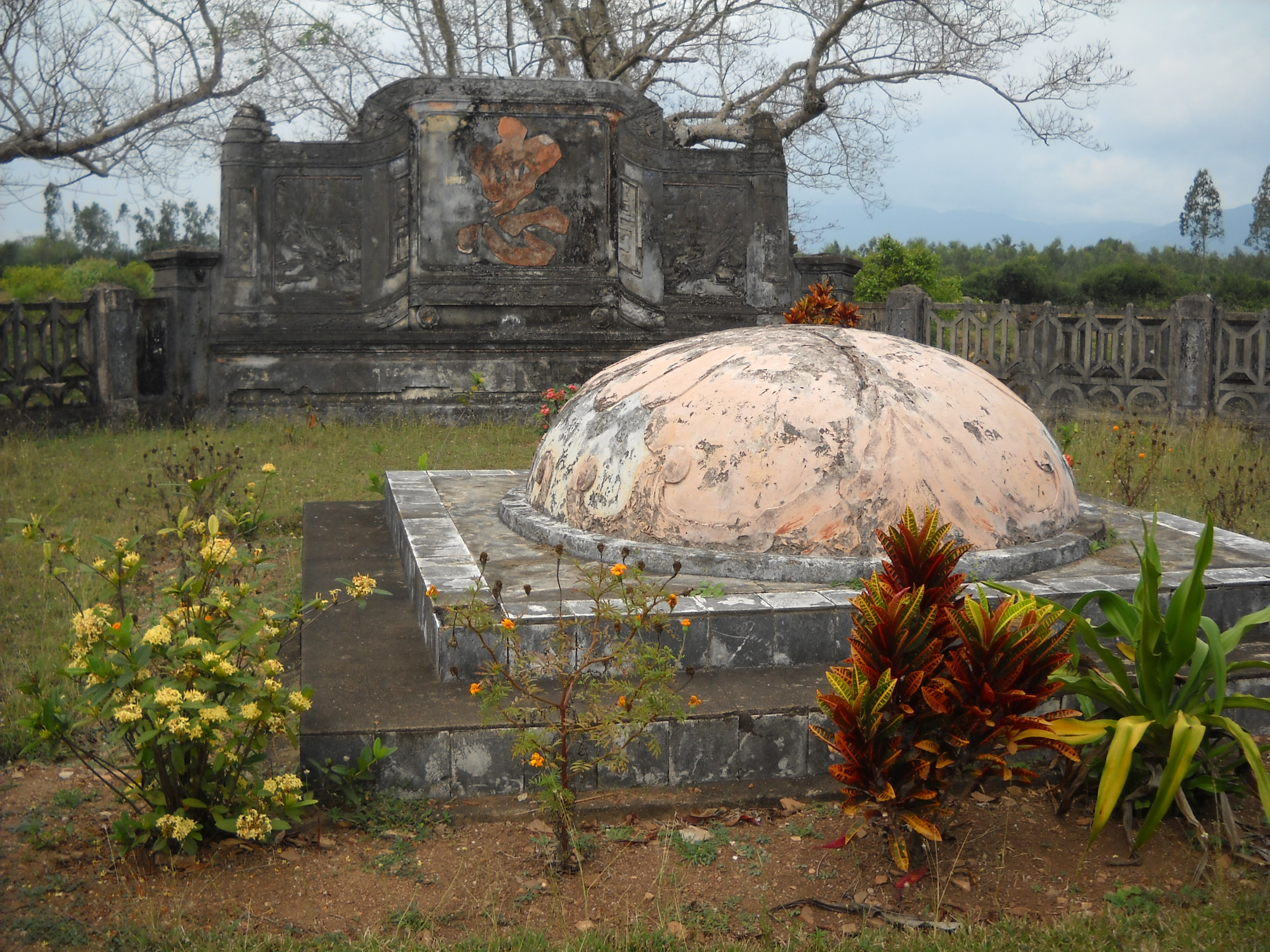
Tomb of Võ Tánh

After refusing to consider the thought of a surrender, Võ Tánh requested the Tây Sơn field commander Trần Quang Diệu to spare his men in exchange for Tanh's own life. Inside the citadel, Võ Tánh ordered his men to pile straw around a wooden tower and fill it with gunpowder. Tánh then went in and blew himself up. Following Tánh's death, one of his generals, Ngô Tòng Châu, drank poisoned wine and another, Nguyễn Tấn Huyên, self-immolated. Afterwards, the citadel defenders surrendered to the Tây Sơn and Trần Quang Diệu spared all the Nguyễn captives. Moreover, Dieu ordered his men to build a tomb for Võ Tánh and his generals.

Later, Nguyễn Ánh, now emperor Gia Long, reburied his remains in Phú Nhuận, Saigon, and posthumously gave him the title Quốc Công (lit., "Duke of the Nation"). Furthermore, he was also posthumously honored by the emperor Minh Mạng, Gia Long's son.

== In popular culture ==
Võ Tánh, along with Đỗ Thanh Nhơn and Châu Văn Tiếp, was called Gia Định Tam Hùng ("Three Heroes of Gia Định") in Vietnamese folk culture. The spirit of Võ Tánh is honoured in festivals and temples - including those where the general speaks through a medium. Pigs sacrificed at the đình festival honouring Võ Tánh are not offered roasted since the general died in a burning fort.
