= Hòa Vang district =

Coordinates: 16.083°N 108.000°E

Hòa Vang district Huyện Hòa Vang
- District
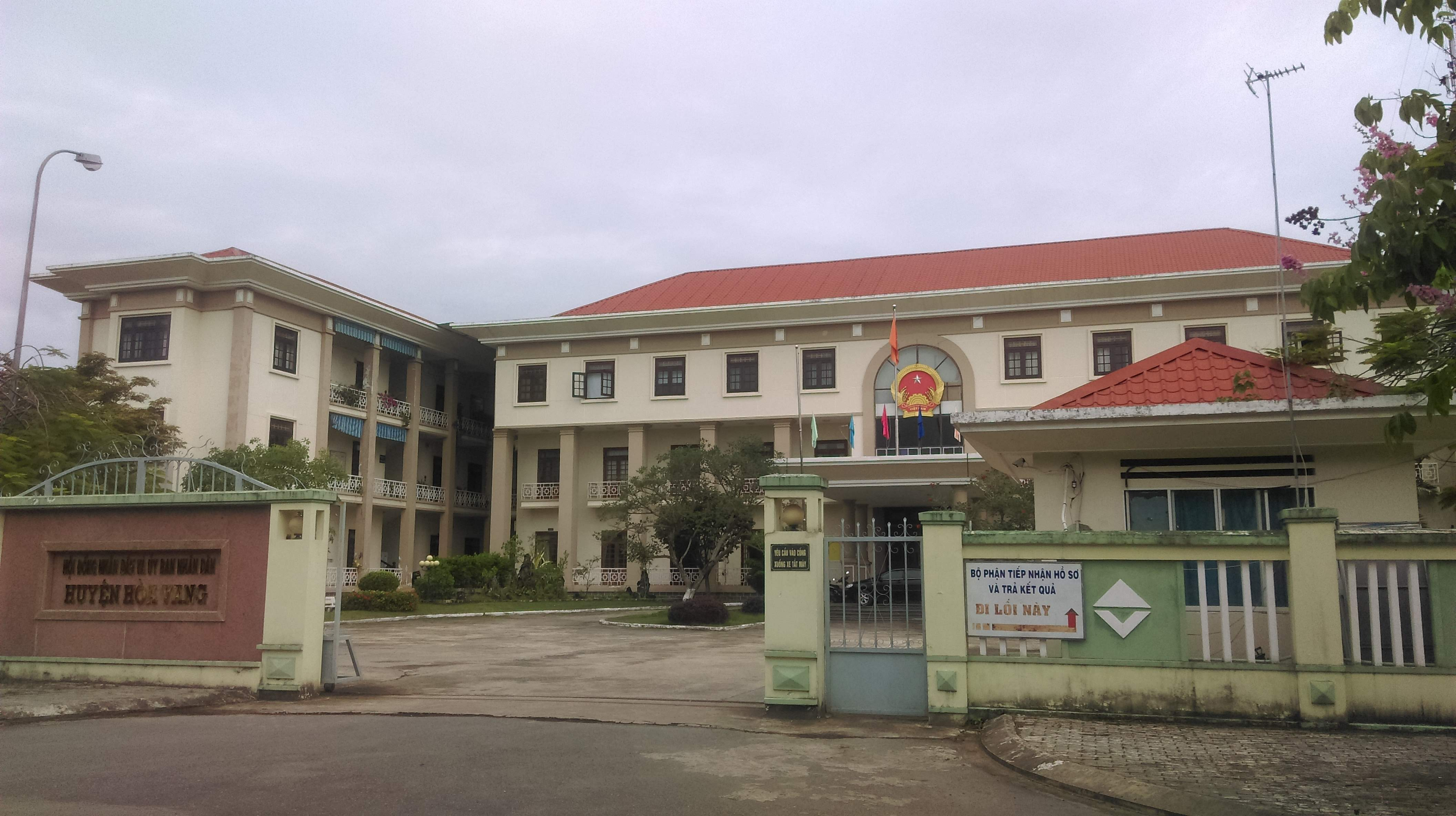
- Hòa Vang District People's Committee

- Seal

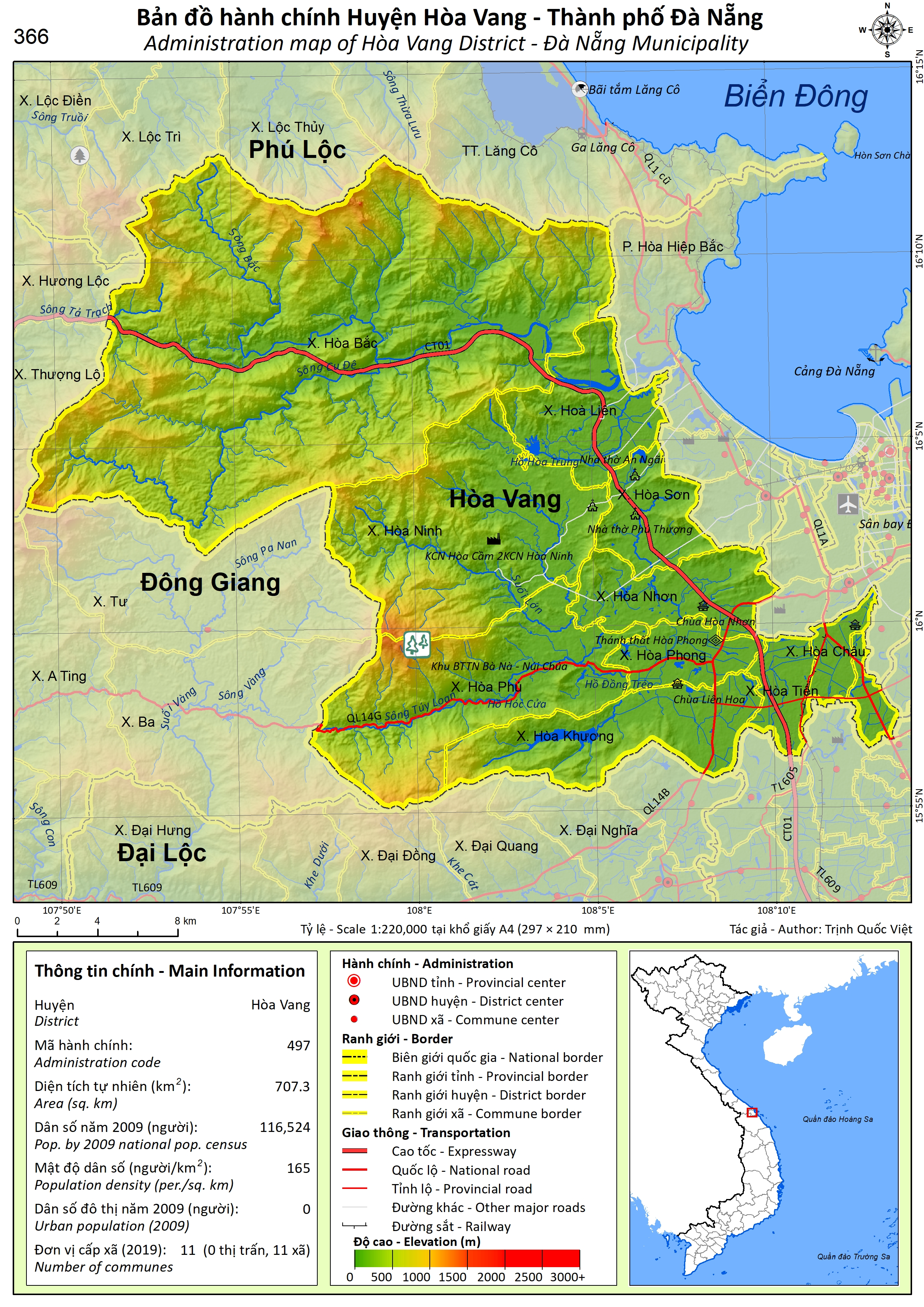
- Administration map of the district in Da Nang
- Country: Vietnam
- Region: South Central Coast
- Municipality: Da Nang

Area
  - Total: 273 sq mi (708 km^{2})

Population (2018)
  - Total: 201,070
- Time zone: UTC+7 (Indochina Time)

Hòa Vang is a former rural district (huyện) of Da Nang in the South Central Coast region of Vietnam. It is bordered by the districts of Liên Chiểu and Cẩm Lệ to the east, Thừa Thiên-Huế province to the north and northwest, and Quảng Nam province to the west and south.

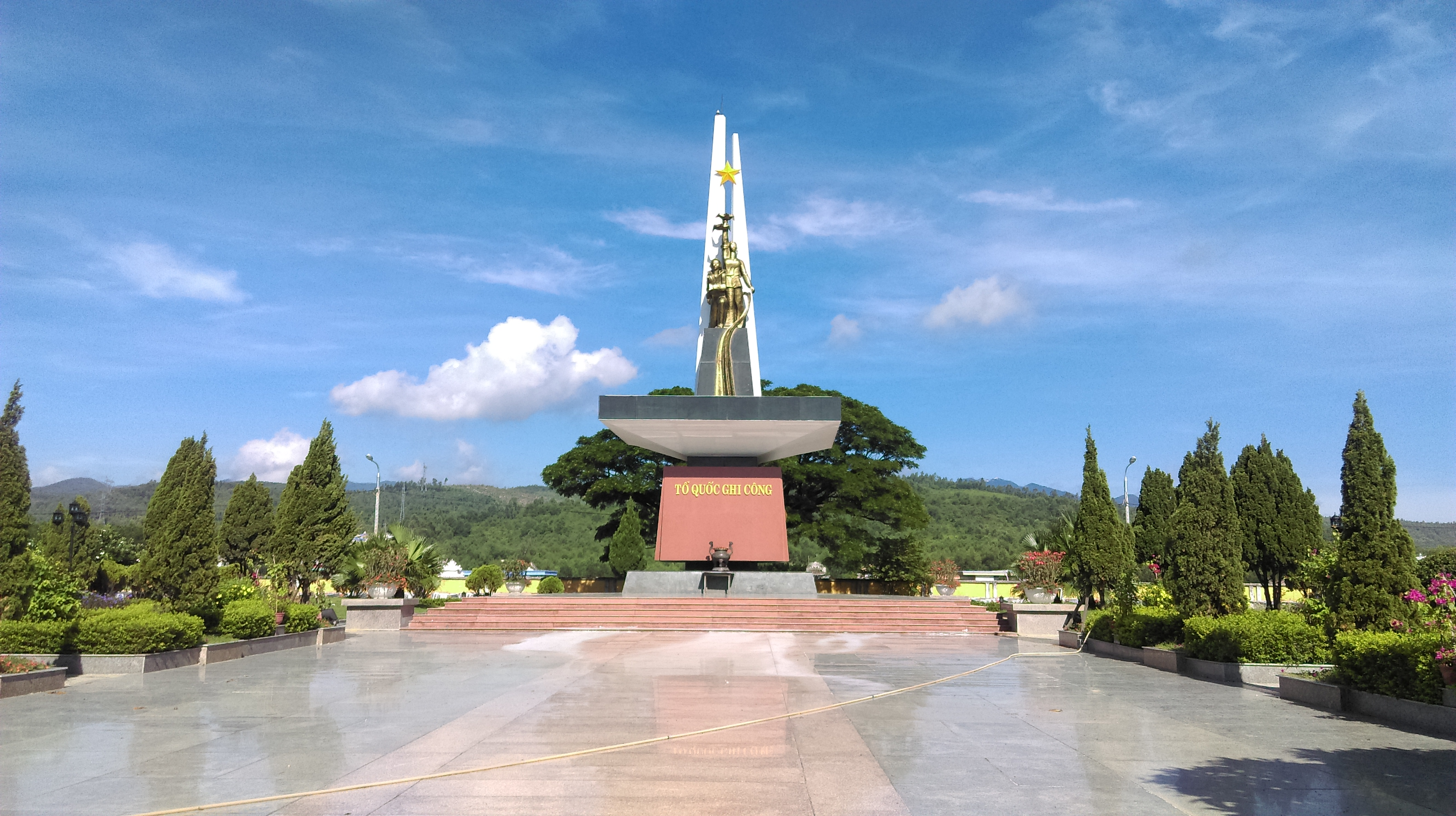
Da Nang Martyrs Cemetery, Hòa Khương

== Administration ==
As of 2003 the district had a population of 106,746. The district covers an area of 708 km^{2} (273 sq mi).

Hòa Vang district is subdivided into 11 rural communes (xã):

- Hòa Bắc
- Hòa Liên
- Hòa Ninh
- Hòa Sơn
- Hòa Nhơn
- Hòa Phong
- Hòa Phú
- Hòa Khương
- Hòa Châu
- Hòa Phước
- Hòa Tiến

The district capital lies at Hòa Phong commune.
