= Thị Nại Port =

Coordinates: 13.779°N 109.247°E

Port of Thi Nai
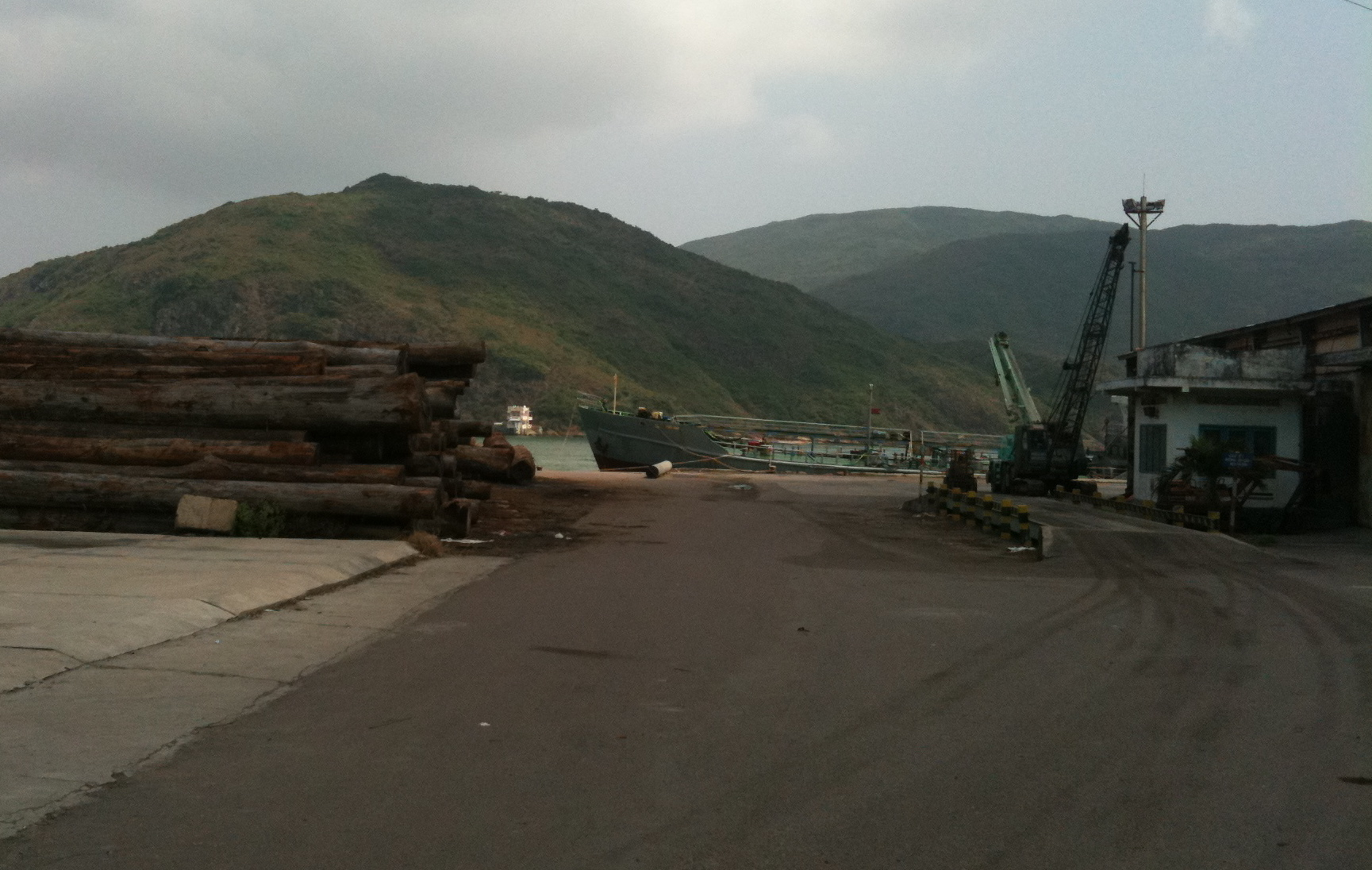
- Thị Nại Port, against the mountains of Phuong Mai Peninsula.
- Interactive map of Port of Thi Nai

Location
- Country: Vietnam
- Location: Quy Nhơn

Thị Nại Port (Vietnamese: Cảng Thị Nại) is the second largest port in Bình Định Province, Vietnam. It is located in Hai Cang (meaning sea port) ward at the eastern tip of Quy Nhơn city. In 2009, 644 tons of goods were handled in Thị Nại Port, of which 113 tons were exported and 3 tons imported.

== History ==
Thị Nại was widely considered as the first port of Champa from the eleventh century to the later fifteenth century. At this time, Thị Nại played an important role in the trading between China, Southeast Asia and Southwest Asia countries. Thị Nại port was also a regional trading center of Champa.

After the Vietnamese destroyed the kingdom of Champa, Thị Nại stayed a trading port. Following the Tây Sơn rebellions, Thị Nại port became a naval port.

In mid 20th century, the government of South Vietnam rebuilt Thị Nại into a supporting naval port. After 1975, the Thị Nại port was continuously used as a naval port until recent years.
