= Nguyễn Phúc Thuần =

Nguyen lord (1754–1777)

Nguyễn Phúc Thuần 阮福淳
- King; Ruler of Cochinchina

King of Nguyễn (阮王)
- Reign: 1765–1777
- Predecessor: Nguyễn Phúc Khoát
- Successor: Nguyễn Phúc Ánh
- Co-ruler: Nguyễn Phúc Dương (1776–1777)
- Born: 31 December 1754; Phú Xuân, Đàng Trong
- Died: 18 October 1777 (aged 22); Gia Định
- Spouse: Nguyễn Phúc Ngọc Thục
- Issue: None
Names
- Nguyễn Phúc Thuần (阮福淳)
Regnal name
- Định Vương (定王)
Posthumous name
- Hiếu Định Hoàng Đế (孝定皇帝)
Temple name
- Duệ Tông (睿宗)
- House: Nguyễn Phúc
- Father: Nguyễn Phúc Khoát
- Mother: Nguyễn Phúc Ngọc Cầu
- Religion: Buddhism

Nguyễn Phúc Thuần (31 December 1754 – 18 October 1777) was one of the Nguyễn lords who ruled over the southern portion of Vietnam from the 16th-18th centuries. The collapse of the Nguyễn lords intensified during Thuần's reign, many uprisings broke out throughout the central part of Vietnam, including the Tây Sơn revolt; as well as the offensive of the Trịnh lords from northern Vietnam. He tried to re-establish the Nguyễn lords' authority but failed to do so. At last, he was captured and executed along with his followers and almost all his family members by Tây Sơn rebel general Nguyễn Huệ in 1777.

Vietnamese royalty
Preceded by Nguyễn Phúc Khoát	Nguyễn lords Lord of Cochinchina; 1765–1777 concurrently with Nguyễn Phúc Dương: 1776-1777	Succeeded by Nguyễn Phúc Ánh
