= Nguyễn Phúc Dương =

Nguyen lord (died 1777)

Nguyễn Phúc Dương 阮福暘
- King; Ruler of Cochinchina

King of Nguyễn (阮王)
- Reign: 1776–1777
- Predecessor: Nguyễn Phúc Thuần
- Successor: Nguyễn Phúc Ánh
- Born: Unknown
- Died: 18 September 1777; Cochinchina
- Spouse: ?
- Issue: None
Names
- Nguyễn Phúc Dương (阮福暘)
Regnal name
- Tân Chính Vương (新政王)
Posthumous name
- Cung Mẫn Anh Đoán Huyền Mặc Vĩ Văn Mục Vương (恭敏英斷玄默偉文穆王)
- House: Nguyễn Phúc
- Father: Nguyễn Phúc Hiệu
- Mother: ?
- Religion: Buddhism

Nguyễn Phúc Dương (died 18 September 1777) was one of the Nguyễn lords who ruled over the southern portion of Vietnam from the 16th-18th centuries. Duong was the first son Nguyễn Phúc Hiệu, who is the son of lord Nguyễn Phúc Khoát. From 1774 to 1776, Duong was captured and used by the Tay Son rebels to gain popularity among the Southern Vietnamese. In 1776, he escaped and fled to Gia Dinh. Thereafter, Lý Tài, a Chinese mercenary general of the Nguyen army, granted him the title of Tân Chính Vương, a co-lord position with Nguyễn Phúc Thuần. In 1777, Dương was captured and executed by Tay Son rebels.

Vietnamese royalty
Preceded by Nguyễn Phúc Thuần	Nguyễn lords Ruler of Cochinchina concurrently with Nguyễn Phúc Thuần: 1776–1777	Succeeded by Nguyễn Phúc Ánh
