= Hoàng Lê nhất thống chí =

Vietnamese historical novel

Hoàng Lê nhất thống chí (皇黎一統志, Records of the Unification of Imperial Lê), also known as An Nam nhất thống chí (安南一統志, Records of the Unification of Annam), written by the Writers of Ngô family (吳家文派, Ngô gia văn phái), is a Vietnamese historical novel written in Classical Chinese which consists of 17 chapter based upon the events in the turbulent late 18th century in Vietnam, starting with the political struggles in the final years of lords Trịnh Sâm's reign and ending with Lê emperor Chiêu Thống's remains returned to Vietnam after Gia Long's unification of the country.

== List of chapters ==
Chapter	Classical Chinese	English
01	鄧宣妃寵冠後宮 王世子廢居幽室	The favored consort Đặng became head of the rear palace, The displaced crown prince was exiled to the dark house.
02	立奠都七輔受遺 殺暉郡三軍扶主	The seven assistants received the will [of Trịnh Sâm] and enthrone Điện Đô, The three armies enthrone the lord after killing Duke of Huy.
03	楊元舅議斬驕兵 阮國師謀清內難	Head Uncle Dương suggested to execute the arrogant soldiers, State Preceptor Nguyễn planned to quell the insubordination.
04	復師讎阮有整援外兵 赴國難李陳公殉故主	Nguyễn Hữu Chỉnh borrowed foreign troops to avenge his master, Mister Lý Trần died after the former lord in the country's struggle.
05	扶正統上公覲闕 締鄰婚公主出車	The high lord entered the palace to aid the legitimate [ruler], The princess got on cart after marrying [the general of] neighboring country.
06	西山王潛師返國 東洋侯倡義扶王	King of Tây Sơn secretly withdrew troops back to his country, The marquises of Đông Giang called to aid the king.
07	翊皇家武成道再出師 焚鄭府晏都王大去國	Vũ Thành army set out again to aid the imperial family, King Yến Đô ran away after Trịnh's palace was set on fire.
08	楊御史就擒獻俘太學 黃郡公戰敗賜死西城	Inspector Dương was captured and offered at Thái Học house, Commandery duke Hoàng was defeated and granted death at the West of the citadel.
09	敵將武文任提兵掠境 宰臣陳公燦奉使議疆	Enemy general Vũ Văn Nhậm mobilized troops to invade the frontier, Head mandarin Trần Công Xán became the messenger to negotiate borders.
10	麟洋侯扶王泛海走安廣 鵬公整請帝渡河走諒山	Marquis of Lân Dương escorted the king to Yên Quảng by sea, Chỉnh, the Duke of Bằng, asked the emperor to cross the river to Lạng Sơn.
11	西山再入城據其國 嗣皇三起駕復故都	The Tây Sơn entered the citadel and occupied the country again, The emperor tried to return to the old capital three times.
12	黎陪臣投內地乞兵 孫督部調大兵出境	Lê escorts took refuge in Inner Land and requested troops, Commander Sun mobilized his army and crossed the border.
13	懾先聲強敵避鋒 得大援故君反正	The powerful enemy withdrew after hearing the news, The former monarch returned after receiving [King of Annam title].
14	戰玉洄清師敗績 棄龍城黎帝如燕	The Qing army was defeated at Ngọc Hồi, The Lê emperor abandoned the Dragon citadel and ran to Yan.
15	定北河平王受封 戰宣光皇弟遇害	King Bắc Bình received [King of Annam title] after pacifying Thăng Long, Lê emperor's brother was killed at the battle of Tuyên Quang.
16	祭苓塘清使受欺 葬燕京黎皇飲恨	The Qing messenger was deceived at the funeral, The Lê emperor died in Yanjing while still harboring grudge.
17	定昇龍偽王就擒 葬磐石皇妃從殉	The false king was captured after [Gia Long] pacified Thăng Long, The empress dowager committed suicide at the funeral held in Bàn Thạch.
