= Tây Sơn military tactics and organization =

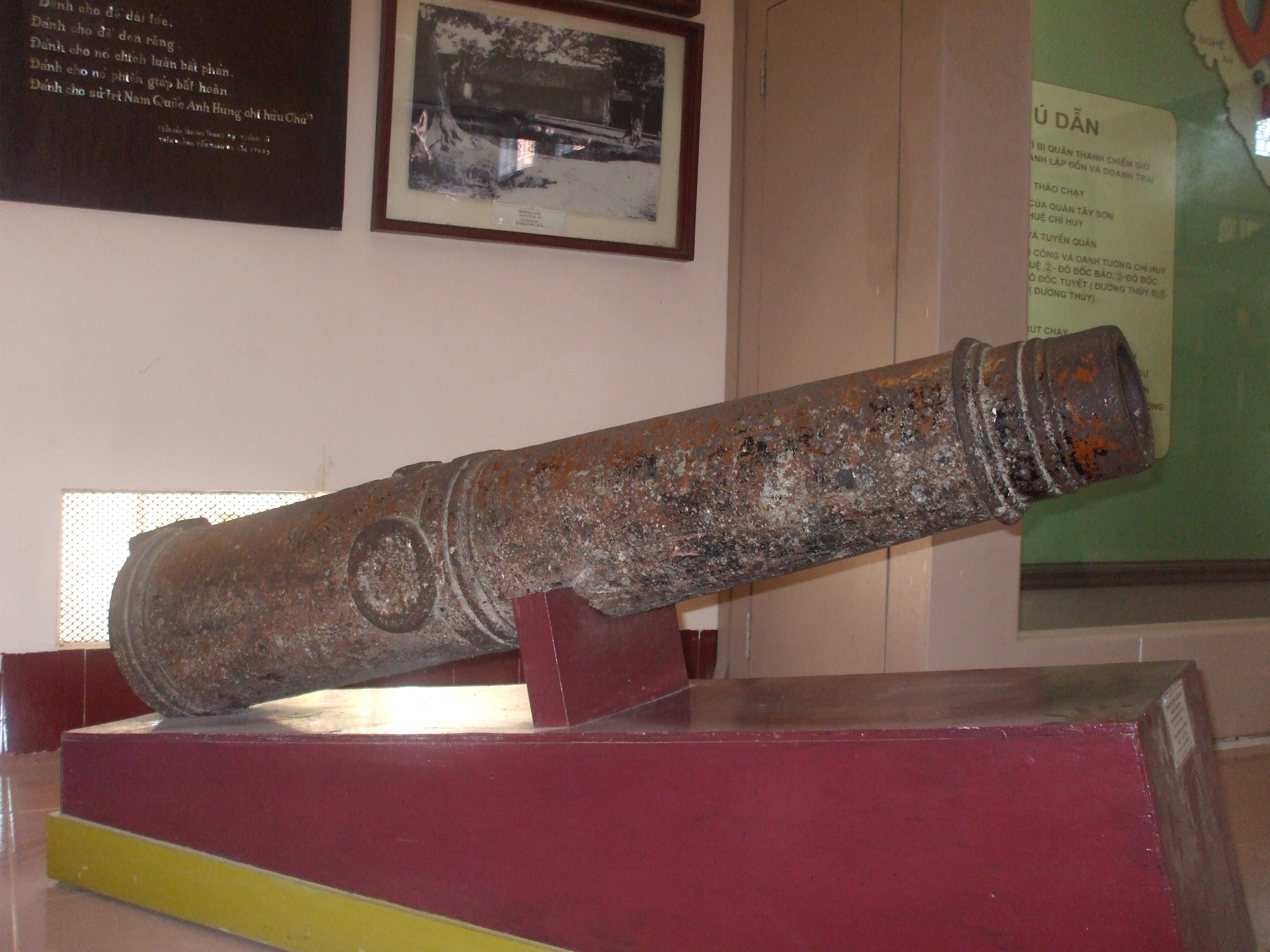
Tây Sơn cannon at Quang Trung Museum, Bình Định province.

The Tây Sơn rebel army incorporated during the three decades of its existence (from 1771 to 1802) new and unconventional ideas of tactics and organization. Logistic and tactical aspects like intelligence analysis, troop co-operation, transport and movement were radically revised, imposed and coupled with deception, diplomacy and guerilla tactics, that eventually proved remarkably efficient. Conceived and applied by military leader Nguyen Hue under whom the Tây Sơn forces engaged into a series of combat operations and skillfully defeated experienced and trained, regular troops, of Cambodia, Siam, Laos, the Chinese Qing empire and the domestic feudal armies of the Trịnh Lords, Nguyễn Lords and the imperial Lê dynasty. Some of the Tây Sơn victories rank among the greatest achievements in Vietnamese military history.

== Background ==
In early 1771 large numbers of the - mainly rural - population in the Tay Son District of the Quy Nhơn Province (modern Bình Định Province), in Vietnam's South Central Coast region had joined the ranks of the three Nguyen brothers: Nguyen Nhac, Nguyen Lu and Nguyen Hue, who had taken up arms in open rebellion against their local lord Nguyễn Phúc Thuần.

The Tây Sơn brothers considered themselves champions of the people and received widespread popular support from the peasantry, from indigenous highland tribes, ethnic Chinese sea traders and troops of the Ly Tai and Dinh families. Leader Nguyễn Huệ announced that the idea was to end feudal oppression, remove corrupt officials and redistribute land, reunite the country and restore the legitimate Lê emperor to power. Patriotism, a just cause, rules and policies implemented to enforce fair, egalitarian treatment and food distribution for all, provided a solid moral basis and stood in stark contrast to the oppressive exploitation of the feudal regime of the landlords.

== Organization ==
In 1788 the army strength had risen to a total of around 100,000 troops, 100 to 300 War Elephants and about 350 cannons.

Unit Type	Number of Troops
Đội (navy force call other name: Thuyền)	60–100
Cơ	300–500
Đạo	1,500–2,500
Doanh	~15.000

The size and strength of the different unit types, called Đội, Cơ, Đạo and Doanh varies, depended on a number of factors, such as the function, the terrain and the tactical location that the unit occupied. Typically, a Đội contained between 60 and 100 men, a Cơ between 300 and 500 soldiers, and a Đạo between 1.500 and 2.500. The structure of the armies of the Lê dynasty, the Trịnh and the Nguyễn is not significantly different.

The Doanh and the Đạo were mixed land units that included elements of infantry, artillery, cavalry and elephantry (as part of a modern combat unit).

=== Navy ===
There were 673 ships and vessels that had been accounted for, run by 53.250 marine soldiers under the command of admiral Vũ Văn Dũng. Large vessels served to carry troops, food and equipment, as the light and flexible boats were used for actual combat.

Types of Tay Son warships
Type-1 battleship	5 to 9 battleships, 600 to 700 men, equipped with 50 to 60 24-pounder cannons The largest Tây Sơn ship, the "Định Quốc" was a Type-1 - defined as a mobile fort in the Hoàng Lê nhất thống chí booklet
Type-2 battleship	40 battleships, 200 men, equipped with 16 12-pounder cannons a versatile and swift ship, used as attack craft and for rapid troop transports
Type-3 battleship	93 battleboats, 200 men, equipped with a single large artillery piece, that fired a 16,3 kg shot
Type-4 battleship	300 gunboats, 50 men, equipped with 1 small cannon.
Type-5 battleship	100 sailing boats, 70 men Any other type of small boats.

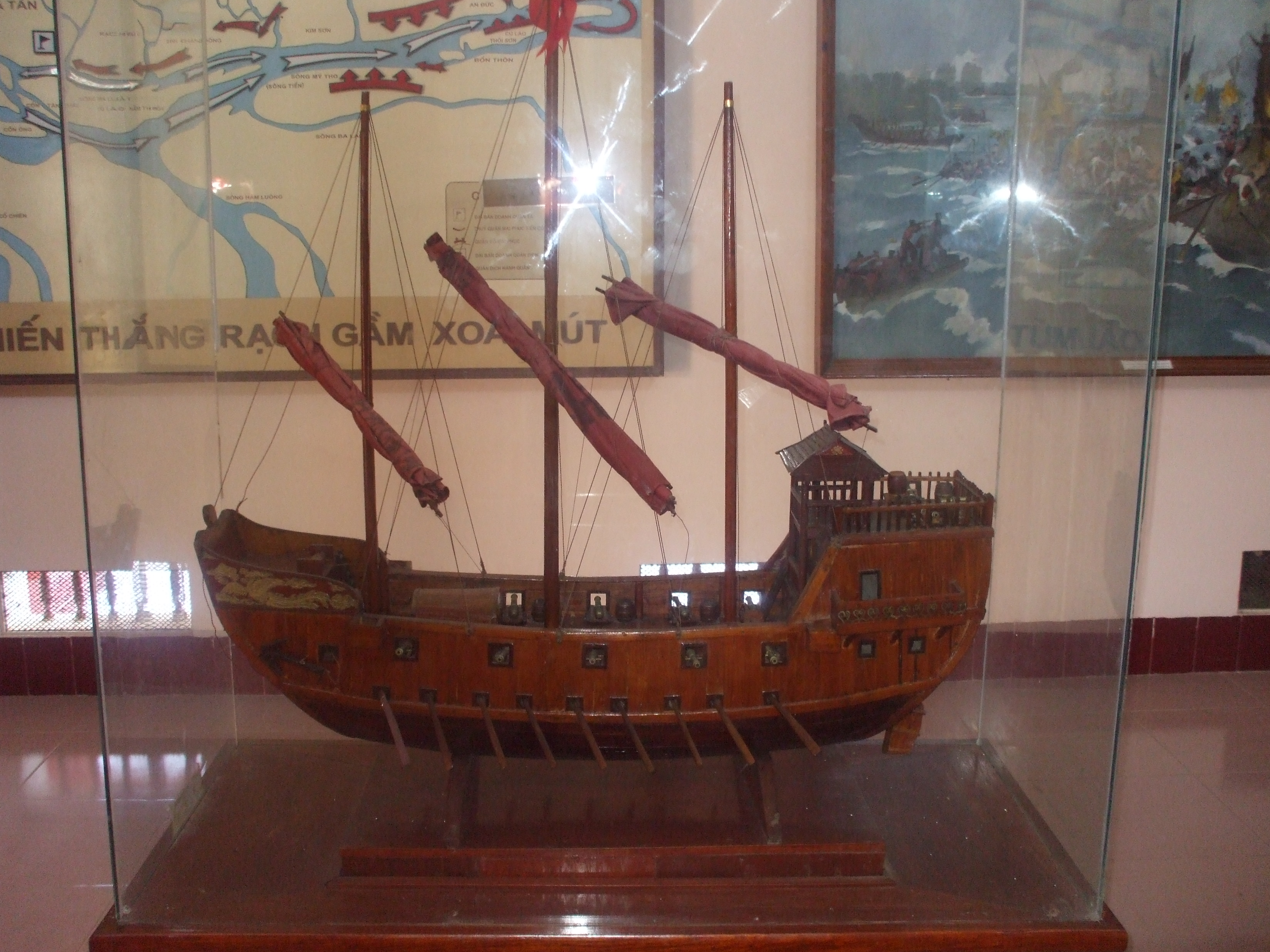
Model of a Tay Son warship, currently on display at the Tay Son Museum (Binh Dinh, Vietnam). A powerful ship by the standards of the time.

The Type-4 battleships and Type-5 battleships were small but easy to handle and very useful for riverine combat. Equipped with oars, its crews were trained in river navigation and long distance troop transportation.

In 1788, Nguyễn Huệ parted forces with Nguyễn Nhạc, and left South Vietnam in response to an attack by Chinese imperial troops. He organized a naval transport for General Bảo to deal with an increasingly drastic situation.

Laurent André Barisy, a French naval officer in Nguyễn lords service, reported on the forces of the Tây Sơn fleet led by Vũ Văn Dũng as follows:

"This force consists of 673 vessels, that include large warships armed with cannon and crew comparable to the largest Western-style warships of Nguyễn Ánh."

Jeaptiste Chaigneau, in Quy Nhơn, states in a letter, that the Tây Sơn navy had 54 battleships, 93 battleboats, 300 gunboats, and 100 sailing boats.

In a letter to Letondal on April 11, 1801, concerning the naval Battle of Thị Nại, Barizy states that the Tây Sơn navy had 4,800 transport boats in the Thị Nại harbor.

== List of Tây Sơn commanders ==
1. Nguyễn Huệ; 2. Bùi Thị Nhạn; 3. Bùi Thị Xuân; 4. Chu Văn Uyển; 5. Đào Văn Hổ; 6. Đặng Văn Chân; 7. Hồ Văn Tự; 8. Huỳnh Thị Cúc; 9. Lê Chất (Note: surrender Nguyễn Ánh); 10. Lê Trung; 11. Lê Văn Hưng (tướng Tây Sơn); 12. Lê Văn Lợi (tướng Tây Sơn); 13. Lê Văn Thanh; 14. Lý Tài; 15. Lý Văn Bưu; 16. Mạc Quan Phù; 17. Ngô Văn Sở; 18. Nguyễn Hữu Chỉnh	1. Nguyễn Lữ; 2. Nguyễn Nhạc; 3. Nguyễn Quang Huy; 4. Nguyễn Quang Thùy; 5. Nguyễn Tăng Long; 6. Nguyễn Thị Dung; 7. Nguyễn Văn Bảo; 8. Nguyễn Văn Danh (Tây Sơn); 9. Nguyễn Văn Điểm; 10. Nguyễn Văn Hòa; 11. Nguyễn Văn Huấn; 12. Nguyễn Văn Trương; 13. Phạm Công Hưng; 14. Phạm Ngạn; 15. Phạm Văn Điềm; 16. Phạm Văn Định; 17. Phạm Văn Tham; 18. Phạm Văn Trị	1. Phan Văn Lân; 2. Tập Đình; 3. Trần Quang Diệu; 4. Trần Thị Lan; 5. Trần Thiên Bảo; 6. Trần Viết Kết; 7. Trịnh Nhất; 8. Trương Văn Đa; 9. Từ Văn Chiêu; 10. Từ Văn Tú; 11. Võ Ðình Tú; 12. Võ Thị Thái; 13. Vũ Thị Đức; 14. Vũ Văn Nhậm; 15. Ya Dố; Naval commanders: 1. Nguyễn Văn Duệ	1. Nguyễn Văn Lộc; 2. Nguyễn Văn Tuyết; 3. Võ Văn Dũng; 4. Vũ Văn Thành; 5. Đặng Xuân Phong; 6. Đặng Xuân Bảo; 7. Đặng Văn Bảo; 8. Đặng Văn Long; 9. Đặng Tiến Giản; 10. Lê Danh Phong; 11. Trần Danh Tuấn; 12. Đào Công Giản; 13. Nguyễn Văn Xuân; 14. Lê Văn An; 15. Lê Quốc Cầu; 16. Trương Phúc Phượng; 17. Kiều Phụng; 18. Đống Công Trường

== Military policies and strategies ==
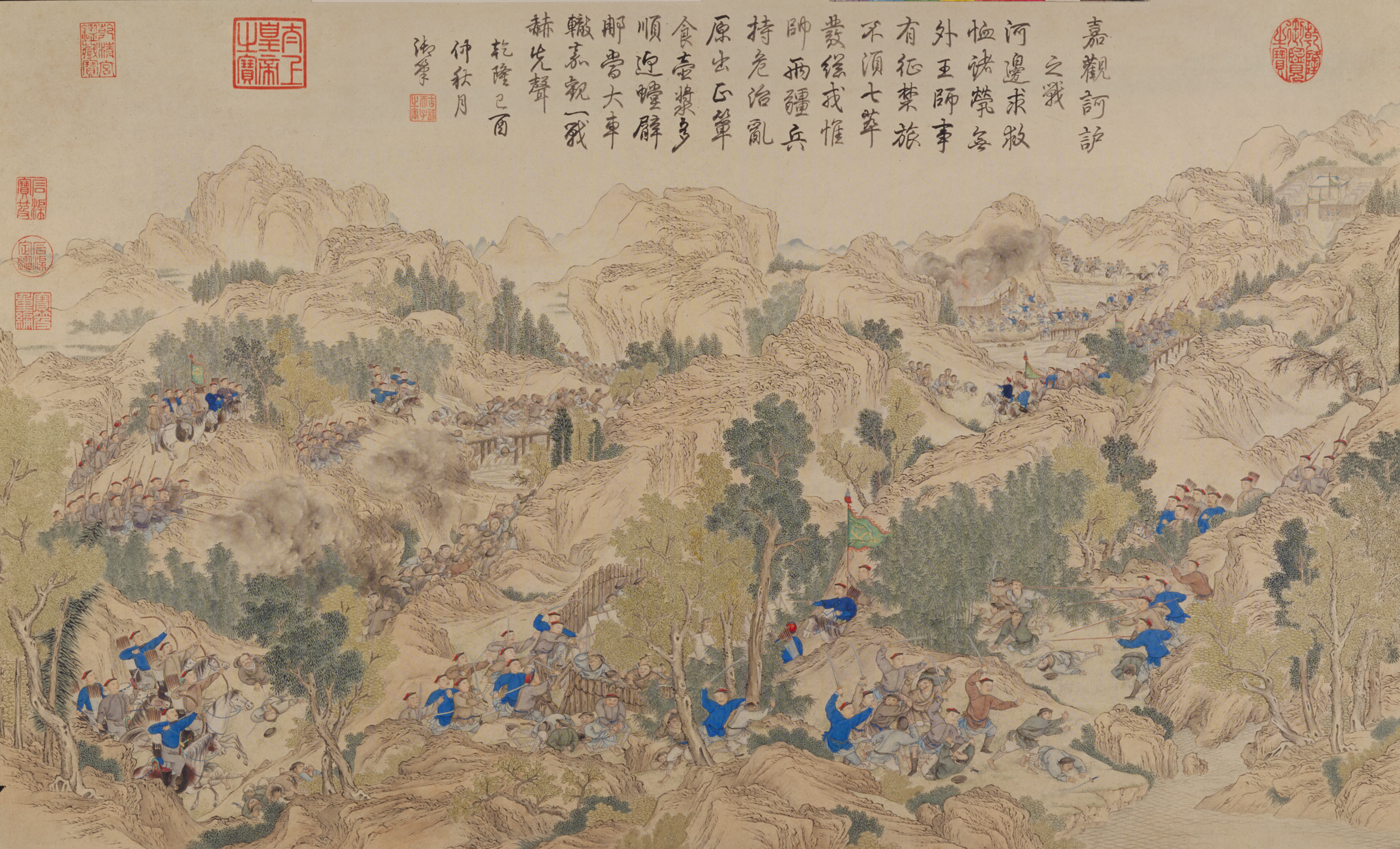
Qing invasion of northern Vietnam in 1788–1789

During the Qing invasion in 1788 the army had reached its greatest strength of 100,000 troops. The enforcement policies of orders, inspections and discipline were very strict. New recruits were immediately submitted to these rules to speed up quick training and deployment. According to an account of Western witnesses, the Tây Sơn entertained a form of people's war, in which virtually all able-bodied men were drafted, including monks, children from the age of 15, old man, smugglers, pirates and ethnic minorities. The women and young girls were required to join the baggage train and work in support of the army

On June 25, 1786, La Bartette states in a letter to Blandin; "They destroyed the finest churches, also all their temples where they captured all the monks and took them to battle."

Aware of the fact that discipline is the basis for military strength, Nguyễn Huệ did not hesitate to resort to violence if he met resistance.

Bertette and Dousssain, who had been evangelizing in Thuận Hóa for a long time, wrote in a letter dated June 11, 1788, Nguyễn Huệ sometimes dispatched between two and three hundred thousand troops.

The Tây Sơn armies avoided clashing with larger armies and only engaged in combat when victory was certain. After the Tây Sơn had offered a peace agreement to the Trịnh lords, they attacked and defeated the Nguyễn lord army. The last surviving Nguyễn lord, Nguyễn Ánh fled Vietnam. In 1786, they attacked the Trịnh lords until Thăng Long (modern Hanoi) fell and Trịnh Tông, the last of Trịnh lords committed suicide. Then the Tây Sơn defeated a Siamese army and navy in 1785. Only 3 years later they defeated a Chinese army. Lê Chiêu Thống - emperor of the Lê dynasty fled to China alongside Sun Shiyi, the commander of the Qing army.

== Tây Sơn tactics ==
=== Caution, concealment and reconnaissance ===
During the Tây Sơn army advance in preparation of the clash with the Siamese army, Nguyễn Huệ avoided suspicious resting places like Gia Định and camped his force in Mỹ Tho, in order to conceal the conduct of his forces as much as possible. He carefully scouted and reconnoitered the situation and waited for a surprise confrontation with the completely exposed enemy.

=== Choose a favorable terrain ===
For the battle of Rach Gam-Xoai Mut, Nguyễn Huệ chose a section of the Mỹ Tho river, in between Rạch Gầm river and Xoài Mút river to confront the Siamese troops. The two small rivers Rạch Gầm and the Xoài played an important part in the plan of Nguyễn Huệ, as the Tây Sơn infantry could be deployed there and block the Siamese navy on the river. At the mouth of the Rạch Gầm and the Xoài Mút river are the Thới Sơn Island and the Hộ island, a convenient place that was chosen to secretly deploy artillery, attack the enemy and easily pick up isolated Siamese detachments, that landed on the shore. The rivers between the islands served as base and ambush stage for the Tây Sơn navy, that was instructed to draw enemy ships into confined areas and single them out where it was easier to deal with them.

=== Night combat ===
One of the most unconventional Tây Sơn tactics was to conduct combat operations during the middle of the night and disengage before dawn. The Tây Sơn troops would spend the day hidden in secret shelters and only struck again, when the situation was advantageous for successful combat.

=== Feint ===
During their first campaign in Northern Vietnam, the Tây Sơn navy was besieged by Trịnh Khải's navy on the Vị Hoàng river. Under the guise of heavy winds, Nguyễn Huệ sent some ships with wooden troop decoys and under full banners to approach the enemy while they still beating the drums. The Trịnh army commander Đinh Tích Nhưỡng believe that, so him order all guns of Trịnh army fire, until exhausted gun shot, he realized Tây Sơn's deception. Eventually, when Nguyễn Huệ's troops suddenly rushed in to fight, the Trịnh forces did not resist and just abandoned their boats and run away. Other Trịnh lord army divisions were also destroyed and the Sơn Nam citadel was demolished.

On December 20, 1788, Tây Sơn reinforcements under the command of Nguyễn Huệ (who was by then Quang Trung emperor) advanced to the Tam Điệp mountains. His generals Ngô Văn Sở, Ngô Thời Nhiệm and Phan Văn Lân, they are apology their mistake, cause suddenly withdrawal when the Qing army attacked Thăng Long. Quang Trung smiled:

"Withdrawal to evade the enemy at the height of their power encourages general morale, and builds arrogance in the enemy force, luring the enemy into our trap. That way is good. You all (Quang Trung's generals) have made no mistake. They have come here (Đại Việt) to buy death, and I am going to give it to them." ("Lui quân để tránh thế giặc, trong khuyến khích tướng sĩ, ngoài làm cho giặc phấn khích, kiêu ngạo, dụ địch vào chỗ hiểm yếu của ta như thế là phải. Các khanh không có tội chi cả. Chúng nó sang đây là mua lấy cái chết đó thôi, ta đã định mẹo cả rồi".)

To make more arrogant in the Qing army, Quang Trung make an order to Trần Danh Bình lead a group eight people, they carried gifts and letters to Sun Shiyi conjured him stop his troops, and listen to understand clearly reasons: "why Tây Sơn had to subvert Lê dynasty". And they also returned to Sun Shiyi 40 Chinese mans. All man was captured by Đắc Thiện Tống pirates commander, after that time, Tây Sơn troops captured him. But Sun Shiyi was beheaded both Trần Danh Bình, and Đắc Thiện Tống. Kept in all messengers to prison. During this time, Quang Trung secret to preparing attack, deciding a plan to kick Qing enemy inside Đại Việt get out their territory. On the morning of December 30, before begin attack, Quang Trung said:

"We came to enemy place, they do not know when they sleeping but we awake, we hit the enemy not in case that mean we massacre the enemy in empty hand, we definitely win..." ("Ta đến mà địch không biết là địch ngủ ta thức, ta đánh mà địch không đề phòng là ta chém kẻ tay không. Ta nhất định thắng...")

That secret factors, the Qing army did not clear the strength of the Tây Sơn, and more disdain, so when Qing army under attack they can not repulse Tây Sơn army.

=== Ambushes and combined forces ===
Preparations for the Battle of Rach Gam-Xoai Mut very well illustrate to how deep Nguyễn Huệ's tactical plannings went. In advance he sent field observers to study and fully understand the laws and tidal phases of river, the characteristics of channels, creeks, estuaries and the terrain on both river banks. He deployed selected forces in the area in advance. In accord with the order of deployment for the elite naval forces, he arranged the most effective concentration of artillery and mobile troops on both sides, ready to attack the front and the rear of Siamese forces, that entered the combat zone. The Tây Sơn also had been trained to carry out combined maneuvers of the navy forces in the rivers, creeks and branches and the infantry, operating on the river banks and the surrounding ground.

=== Rapid movement ===
The French Clergyman Le Breton wrote in a letter on August 2, 1788: "As it happened Nguyen Hue returned to Phu Xuan in early July. He had rushed his troops so fast that many of his soldiers died of fatigue and heat. Even the elephants and horses, they died too."

According to Nguyễn Huệ's own account he once led an infantry and cavalry contingent in a 10 days march from Phú Xuân to Thăng Long in order to catch and execute Vũ Văn Nhậm. The reliability of this remarkable feat is supported by an entry in the Diary of the Bac Ha Missionary Church. The report on the strength of the Quang Trung emperor sent to the Central Church reads: "He (Nguyen Hue) moved like a hurricane to the North that only took 10 days, the long distance has killed many of his elephants and horses after 3 to 4 days." A distance of more than 600 km (372.82 mi) as roads traverse mountains and cross rivers, in a 10 days march with such a large army is extraordinary. Horses and elephants dropped dead along the road. Nguyen Hue applied his principle of collective, continuous day and night move. He had his troops form teams of three, that rotated with each other, as on the march two people shielded the third person.

=== Surprise attack ===
Not only did attack speed, Quang Trung's twin tactic was to attack suddenly, to strike at unbelievable times, preventing their defenses from leading to defeat.

In the offensive in 1786, while the commander of Trịnh army was out of alert, the Tây Sơn troops began their journey on 28 April lunar month, that 25 May 1786. In the middle of the fifth lunar month of 1786, Tây Sơn's army led by Nguyễn Huệ make a surprise attack, the Trịnh army failed to turn up. Hoàng Nghĩa Hồ rescued his troops and was killed. To capture Hải Vân, Nguyễn Huệ immediately forward troops to Phú Xuân. The second time, the Trịnh troops surprise. Trịnh Tông concentrated in the Tây Long fort, there were 100 war elephants, totaling 30.000 Trịnh troops on Thăng Long defense. In the critical situation known to be attacked, Trịnh was still not alert, suggesting that the Tây Sơn troops could not advance to Thăng Long quickly. Eventually, the Trịnh lordship collapsed.

On December 20, 1789, Tây Sơn troops came to Ninh Bình. After reviewing the situation, Quang Trung told his soldiers that in just 10 days, Qing army would be cleaned up. Qing army and Lê Chiêu Thống are in preparation for the Tết holiday, which is not well protected, plus Sun Shiyi's arrogance makes them really surprised. Soon, within six days of the Lunar New Year, the Tây Sơn troops destroyed the Qing army. At 5th Lunar New Year in 1789, Tây Sơn troops entered Thang Long. Sun Shiyi warriors run away, on the road running successively defeated by Tây Sơn soldiers. Finally, Sun Shiyi and Lê Chiêu Thống run away to China.

== List wars and battles ==
- First Tây Sơn-Nguyễn lords war
- Tây Sơn attacks Cambodia
- Battle of Rạch Gầm-Xoài Mút
- Tây Sơn-Trịnh lords war
  - Battle of Cẩm Sa
  - Phú Xuân campaign of 1786
  - Thăng Long campaign (1786)
- Battle of Ngọc Hồi-Đống Đa
- Tây Sơn invade Laos
- Second Tây Sơn-Nguyễn lords
  - Siege of Quy Nhơn
  - Battle of Thị Nại (1801)
  - Battle of Trấn Ninh (1802)
