= Lê Ngọc Hân =

Vietnamese writer (1770–1799)

- Queen (Empress) consort of Đại Nam
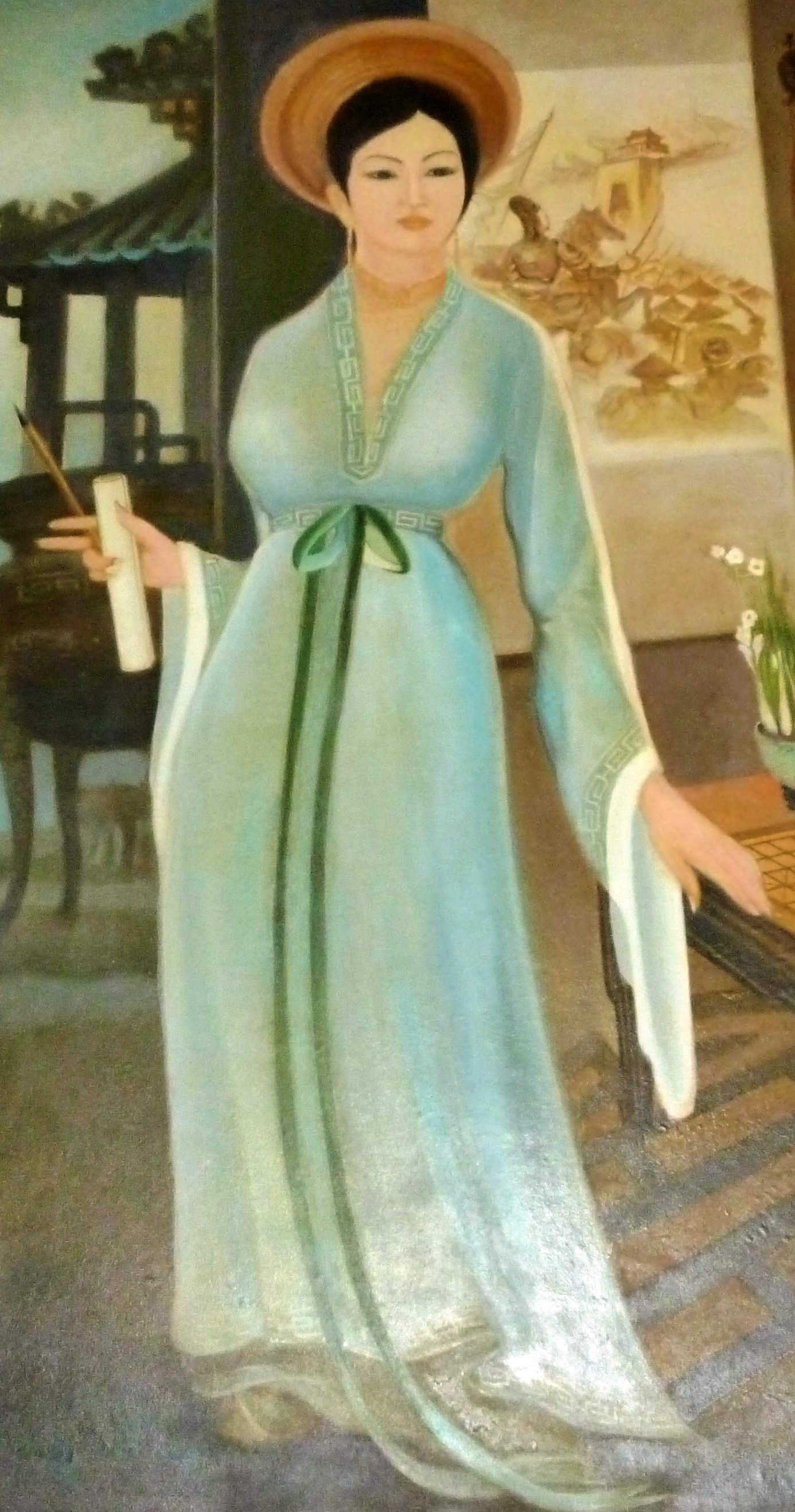
- Tenure: 1786?–1792
- Born: 1770
- Died: 1799 (aged 28–29)

Lê Ngọc Hân

Vietnamese name
- Vietnamese: Lê Thị Ngọc Hân
- Hán-Nôm: 黎氏玉忻

Princess Lê Thị Ngọc Hân (Note: In this Vietnamese name, the surname is Lê, but is often simplified to Le in English-language text. In accordance with Vietnamese custom, this person should be referred to by the given name, Ngọc Hân.) (chữ Hán: 黎玉昕, 1770 – 1799) also known as Ngọc Hân or Bắc Cung Hoàng Hậu (Empress of the Northern Palace), was a famous historical figure in 18th-century Vietnam. She was a princess of the Later Lê dynasty, and later became the second wife of Emperor Quang Trung (Nguyễn Huệ) one of Vietnam’s greatest military leaders.

Her life has often been romanticized as a love story between a noble princess and a rising general. Ngọc Hân came from a royal family in decline, while Nguyễn Huệ who had peasant origins was the leader of the Tây Sơn rebellion, a revolutionary force threatening the Lê dynasty’s continued existence.

== Biography ==
Lê Ngọc Hân was born on April 27, 1770 in the royal capital of Thăng Long (modern-day Hanoi) She was the 9th or possibly 21st daughter of Emperor Lê Hiển Tông. Her mother, Nguyễn Thị Huyền, held the title Chiêu Nghi (a high-ranking imperial consort), she came from Phù Ninh village in what is now Ninh Hiệp, Gia Lâm District, Hanoi, where her father Nguyễn Đình Giai, a respected scholar had sent her to the royal palace, where she rose in status.

Growing up Ngọc Hân was skilled and took a particular great interest in the classics and history, and was gifted in writing poetry and prose.

== Marriage to Nguyễn Huệ ==
In May 1786, Tây Sơn general Nguyễn Huệ marched north with the declared goal of ”supporting the Lê destroying the Trịnh”.—referring to his intention of removing the powerful Trịnh lords who had long dominated the Lê court and its emperors for the past two centuries. After defeating the Trịnhs, Nguyễn Huệ entered the capital Thăng Long, where he recognized the Emperor Lê Hiển Tông’s legitimacy. With the matchmaking of Nguyễn Hữu Chỉnh, a Northern official who supported the Tây Sơn, Ngọc Hân was married to Nguyễn Huệ, the marriage, solidified further influence he had in the North. She was only 16 years old, while he was 33 and already married to Phạm Thị Liên, his main wife.

Just days after the wedding, Emperor Lê Hiển Tông, her father died from illness after a 46-year reign. A succession dispute followed. Ngọc Hân wanted her older brother, prince Lê Duy Cận to take the throne, believing that her brother was closer to the line of succession and had more legitimacy. But the Lê royal family pushed for Lê Duy Kỳ, her nephew, who was the son of a former crown prince. Under pressure from the royal family, she gave in, and Lê Duy Kỳ became emperor known as Lê Chiêu Thống, he would become the final ruler of the Le Dynasty. Shortly after, she followed Nguyễn Huệ back South to Thuận Hóa.

After becoming emperor in 1787, attempting to restore royal power, Chiêu Thống relied on fragmented noble support, but his efforts to raise loyalist forces only fueled further instability. In 1787, sensing the resurgence of Lê supporters, Tây Sơn general Vũ Văn Nhậm with permission, led an expedition north where he defeated the remaining Lê-aligned factions and seized the capital Thăng Long once again, forcing Lê Chiêu Thống to flee into hiding. This time Nhậm installed Lê Duy Cận, Ngọc Hân’s brother as a Prince Regent. Stripped of authority, Chiêu Thống fled north into the mountains and into Yunnan where he sought help from Qing China and Emperor Qianlong, requesting military intervention, and begging them to restore him to the throne. Seeing it as a chance to reassert Chinese influence over Vietnam, his request was granted. This led to the massive Qing invasion of Vietnam in 1788. This act of requesting foreign intervention enraged the entire country, people of all factions including those formerly loyal to the Lê and seen as a national betrayal, setting the stage for one of Vietnam’s most legendary victories.

== Becoming Empress ==
In late 1788, Qing China sent over 200,000 troops to northern Vietnam with the goal of reinstalling the exiled Lê Chiêu Thống. In response, Nguyễn Huệ then ruler of Central Vietnam proclaimed himself Emperor, taking the title Quang Trung, marking the beginnings of the Tây Sơn dynasty, he gave Ngọc Hân the title Hữu Cung Hoàng Hậu (“Right Palace Empress”), since his first wife, Phạm Thị Liên, already held the title of the main empress.

He then gathered a disciplined and experienced Tây Sơn army, and led what was known as a ‘legendary lightning-fast’ march of over 1,000 km from Phú Xuân (Huế) to Thăng Long (Hanoi) in just 10 days, striking during the Tết, Lunar New Year, when the Qing forces were celebrating and unprepared. Using superior tactics, mobility, and intimate knowledge of the terrain, Nguyễn Huệ launched simultaneous attacks on Qing positions. At the fortified village of Ngọc Hồi, south of Thăng Long, Qing troops had built strong defensive positions with artillery and entrenched infantry. Nguyễn Huệ forces advanced with wooden shields and armor soaked in water to resist musket fire and explosives. The Tây Sơn army launched a fierce frontal assault, using a combination of close-range grenades, hand-to-hand combat, and war elephants to break enemy lines. The Qing defenders were overwhelmed, and tens of thousands were killed in brutal combat. As surviving Qing forces retreated toward Đống Đa, they were ambushed by Tây Sơn units who had already planned ahead, a maneuver to cut off their escape. The chaos and panic led to mass casualties. Qing General Sun Shiyi abandoned the rest of his troops and fled across the border with only a handful of followers. At Đống Đa, tens of thousands of Qing soldiers died. Out of respect towards his dead enemies, Nguyễn Huệ had them buried with courtesy at Đống Đa. The victory humiliated the Qing court, ended Lê Chiêu Thống’s hopes of restoration, and forced China to recognize Quang Trung as the legitimate ruler.

The Battle of Ngọc Hồi-Đống Đa is remembered as one of Vietnam’s greatest military triumphs, a moment when a smaller and overwhelmed but determined Vietnamese force outwitted and crushed one of the world’s largest empires. With no path back to power, the Lê dynasty was abolished and Lê Chiêu Thống lived the rest of his life in exile in China, where he was given a low-ranking position and stripped of royal dignity where he died, widely remembered as a symbol of treason and betrayal for inviting foreign troops into Vietnam.

Now emperor of a unified Central and Northern Vietnam, Nguyễn Huệ promoted Ngọc Hân to Bắc Cung Hoàng Hậu (“Empress of the Northern Palace”). She had two children with him. Princess Nguyễn Thị Ngọc Bảo (阮氏玉寶) and Prince Nguyễn Quang Đức (阮光德).

== Widowhood and death ==
In the 5th year of his reign (1792), Nguyễn Huệ unexpectedly died at the age of 40. After his death, Nguyễn Quang Toản son of his first wife, Empress Phạm Thị Liên—ascended the throne under the reign title “Cảnh Thịnh”, at the young age of 9 years old and thus was referred to as Emperor Cảnh Thịnh. Since Lady Lê Ngọc Hân was a secondary wife, she was elevated to the title of Empress Dowager (Hoàng Thái Hậu).

According to the essay “Lady Lê Ngọc Hân” by Chu Quang Trứ, after Nguyễn Huệ’s death, Lê Ngọc Hân had lost all political power. She voluntarily left the royal palace in Phú Xuân, modern-day Huế) with her two children and lived in Kim Tiền Pagoda (in Dương Xuân, near the Đan Dương shrine) to mourn her husband and raise their children. On December 4, 1799. She died at just 29 years old.

Phan Huy Ích, the Minister of Rites under the Tây Sơn dynasty, was ordered to write five funeral eulogies in her honor: one from Emperor Cảnh Thịnh, one from the princesses, one from Lady Nguyễn Thị Huyền (her mother), one from the Lê royal family, and one from her maternal relatives in Phù Ninh Village. Emperor Cảnh Thịnh himself read the eulogy at her altar. She was posthumously granted the honorific title: Nhu Ý Trang Thuận Trinh Nhất Vũ Hoàng hậu — meaning “The Empress of Gentleness, Grace, Loyalty, Chastity, and Bravery.” All five eulogies were later included in the literary collection Dụ Am Văn Tập.

According to the Nguyễn Đình family records on her maternal side, when the Tây Sơn dynasty began to collapse and Nguyễn Phúc Ánh (future Emperor Gia Long)’s army seized the village of Phú Xuân, Prince Nguyễn Quang Đức her son died on December 23, 1801, at just 10 years old. Whilst her daughter, Princess Ngọc Bảo died not a year later on May 18, 1802, at only 12 years old.

=== Posthumous eulogy ===
In 1799, after Lê Ngọc Hân’s passing, Emperor Cảnh Thịnh ordered Phan Huy Ích to compose an official eulogy conferring her posthumous title. The full text reads:

”I present these words like the warmth of the sun, newly spreading over fragrant blossoms; like a bird dancing in deep clouds, soaring in eternal grace. Time passes, yet memory remains; the record of virtue shall endure.
The late Vũ Empress from the royal palace possessed elegance and intelligence, an ideal partner for a scholar-king. She fulfilled her duties as wife and mother, embodying the teachings of the inner chambers and transmitting the values of harmony and refinement. Her grace and virtue were celebrated throughout the empire; her presence brought joy to both the royal family and the people.
When fate took her before her time, sorrow spread across the land. Though she is gone, her memory is preserved in rites and rituals, and her honor shall never fade.
Therefore, we respectfully confer upon her the title: Nhu Ý Trang Thận Trinh Nhất Vũ Hoàng hậu (“The Empress of Gentleness, Grace, Loyalty, Chastity, and Bravery.”) We pray she will shine her wisdom upon us from the heavens and bless the nation’s continued prosperity. For 14 years, she demonstrated goodness and charm, leaving behind a legacy of grace. Let future generations remember her name as one who enriched our dynasty and deepened the royal lineage”

== Burial and legacy ==
=== Burial ===
In 1804, Lady Nguyễn Thị Huyền (Lê Ngọc Hân’s mother) grieved deeply over the deaths of her daughter and two grandchildren in a ‘faraway land’. She secretly hired people to retrieve their remains from Phú Xuân and return them to her families ancestral estate (Thiết Lâm Hall).

On July 16, 1804, Lady Huyền arranged for Lê Ngọc Hân to be buried at the center, with her children, the prince to her left and the princess to her right. This burial site is believed to be what is now known as Bãi Cây Đại or Bãi Đầu Voi, near the entrance of Nành Village, Phù Ninh Commune (now Ninh Hiệp, Gia Lâm District, Hanoi).

Historian Chu Quang Trứ, referencing Đại Nam Thực Lục confirms this:

“Around the first year of Gia Long’s reign, a former Tây Sơn officer named Hài secretly brought the remains of Lê Ngọc Hân and her children from Phú Xuân to the village of Phù Ninh and buried them in secret. Lady Huyền covertly built a tomb, a shrine, and an inscribed stele under fake names to avoid detection.”

Nearly 50 years later, during the reign of Emperor Thiệu Trị (1840–1847), the tomb and shrine fell into disrepair. A local scholar from Nành Village, grateful for the help Lady Lê had once given to the village, raised funds to restore the shrine. However, a local deputy chief who held a grudge against the scholar reported him to authorities, accusing him of worshiping a “Tây Sơn traitor.” The Huế court ordered the shrine destroyed, the tombs dug up, and the remains thrown into the Red River. The scholar was punished severely, and Nguyễn Đăng Giai, the Governor of Bắc Ninh, was demoted for failing to prevent the worship of a “rebel.”

Historian Trần Quốc Vượng also confirmed the event:

“Lady Nguyễn Thị Huyền, through her daughter Ngọc Bình, submitted a request to have Ngọc Hân’s remains (and her children’s) reburied in their hometown. Emperor Gia Long approved it. The bone remains were transported by boat and reinterred in Nành Village with a proper tomb. However, in Thiệu Trị’s reign, a local official, out of resentment, accused the Nguyễn family of profiting off the ‘rebel tomb,’ and the authorities, for unknown reasons, approved the accusation. The tomb was desecrated and the remains thrown into the Red River.”

Today, in Gia Lâm, there is a shrine known as Đền Ghềnh, believed to be very sacred. Local legend says it is where Lê Ngọc Hân’s remains washed ashore and were reburied by the villagers.

=== Written poetry ===
After her husband Nguyen Hue’s death, she wrote two poems, Tế vua Quang Trung (Funeral Lament for Emperor Quang Trung) and Ai Tư Vãn (A Lament To My Beloved) to express her profound grief and boundless sorrow for her husband whose life was cut short. Among these, Ai Tư Vãn is especially famous in Vietnam.

AI TƯ VÃN – A Lament To My Beloved

The wind sighs low, the chamber cold as stone,
Before the orchid steps, flowers wither alone.
Incense drifts faint on Fairy Bridge’s crest,
The dragon chariot gone her shadow now finds no rest.

Oh fate! Must sorrow always claim its prize?
Why must our love be veiled in cruel disguise?
Grief upon grief, sorrow’s endless tide
As deep as oceans swell, as high as heavens wide.

You bore the crimson flag toward northern skies,
A prince in service, righteous, brave, and wise.
At Father’s word, you left with steady hand,
Your orchid boat set forth, to seek my hand.

Mountains and rivers could not bar your way,
Our union sealed beneath the will of fate that day.
Love grew beneath the gods’ high dome,
With music, grace, and laughter in our home.

You shielded me, no fault too small to see,
Every word you spoke, a vow to cherish me.
Though empires fall and kingdoms turn to clay,
My heart, once yours, will never drift away.

You cared for blossom and for branch, so dear,
And all our kin rejoiced with joy sincere.
The shrine still holds your spirit near,
While pines stand guard, still tall, still clear.

Our children bloomed in fortune’s golden light,
Born of your warmth, their roots grew strong and right.
Beneath southern skies we gave our prayers,
In royal odes and incense-laced airs.

We dreamed of years—a thousand long embrace,
A quiet life, our joys in slow-paced grace.
But oh! The sea ran dry, the rivers died,
Heaven turned, and tore our lives aside.

Summer sun gave way to autumn’s rain,
And my dragon grew weary, sick with pain.
Dread and terror, my only guide,
I begged the gods, I wept, I tried.

We summoned healers far and wide,
But fate gave no reprieve, no cure supplied.
Oh cruel Creator, heartless sky!
You snatched him with a storm—no word, no why.

How brief the joy we had, how swift the pain!
Just years we shared before all hope was slain.
My soul now drifts like cloud or foam,
Lost in a world that holds no home.

Through sleepless nights and sunless days,
I search for light in memory’s haze.
I dream you call, then wake to none,
Alone beneath the weeping sun.

A breeze stirs petals on the stone-cold ground,
I think you’re near—I turn around.
I fix my dress to greet you true,
But only spider webs greet my view.

A moonbeam flickers through trembling leaves,
I chase your shadow my heart believes.
Yet snow falls quiet where you stood,
And silence chills my widowhood.

My soul cries out to where you dwell,
Is there no word, no sign, no spell?
Can no one cross that shadowed gate,
To ask if you are well of late?

Two paths diverged—this world, that dark shore,
We pledged our fates, but time closed the door.
If not in this life, let next be kind
That we may walk as one, not left behind.

I hear the ancients lived long with fame,
Kings Tang and Wu bore time’s acclaim.
You, too, raised flags from peasant thread,
And carved a kingdom where none dared tread.

Like Yao and Shun of virtuous reign,
You ruled with grace, through storm and strain.
Your mercy fell like gentle rain,
On every shore, on hill and plain.

How cruel then, that one so great
Should meet so soon a shortened fate.
If I could give my years to you,
I would, and think the bargain true.

Now tears fall soft as autumn dew,
Each drop a note of grief anew.
I hear your parting, faint and far,
In dreams that shatter where you are.

Spring returns, but flowers mourn—
For whom do they now bloom each morn?
I’ll brave the waves, I’ll brave the flame,
To keep your vow, to guard your name.

'

Yet I remain for our unborn,
The tender buds not yet full-grown.
Though here I dwell, my soul has fled
To follow you where spirits tread.

Though my breath remains, my heart is gone,
Each beat a ghost of love withdrawn.
I dress in white, I veil my face,
I linger in this hollow place.

In moonless nights I speak your name,
Yet only echoes speak the same.
The wind replies with mournful breath,
As if it too has tasted death.

They say, “You must endure, be still.
For children’s sake, you must have will.”
But how can roots take hold and grow,
When torn from soil they used to know?

If not for them, I’d follow through—
That gate of fire to be with you.
I’d ride the wind, I’d cross the sea,
To find the place where souls run free.

Each morning comes, each night returns,
Yet all I feel is grief that burns.
I sit alone and light the flame,
Whispering to your honored name.

Your portrait hangs on temple wall,
I bow, I kneel, I plead, I call.
Can you not hear these tears I shed?
Can love reach past the veil of dead?

In every meal, I set your bowl,
A seat for you, a space, a role.
In dreams I see you, tall and bright,
And wake alone in shattered light.

I keep your sword, I guard your books,
I walk the halls, I search your looks.
The garden’s still, the birds don’t sing,
For death has silenced everything.

The men you led, now draped in black,
Recall your words, your wisdom back.
They chant your deeds in tales well-known,
But still my bed is cold as stone.

I live beneath your rising fame,
Yet what is glory next to name?
The name I whispered soft at night,
The one that turned my dark to light.

I burn the scroll, I burn the plea,
In hope that ash might carry me.
To where your soul in quiet stands,
Beyond this world, beyond man’s lands.

Let emperors and kings be praised,
Let bards recount the wars you braved.
But let them also speak of me
The widow trapped in memory.

One day I’ll join you, proud and free,
And there our love shall ever be.
Two phoenixes in heaven’s flame,
Reborn beyond all grief and shame.

For now, I wait, I guard our line,
With loyal heart and will like pine.
I raise our children in your name,
To honor both your love and flame.

When they are grown, and I grow old,
When all is done and fate is told—
I’ll climb the pyre with fearless breath,
And meet you in the land of death.

So hear me, love, from far away,
Beyond where mortal eyes can stray—
My soul is yours, in night and sun,
And we shall meet when all is done.
