= Ngô Văn Sở =

Vietnamese general of Tây Sơn dynasty

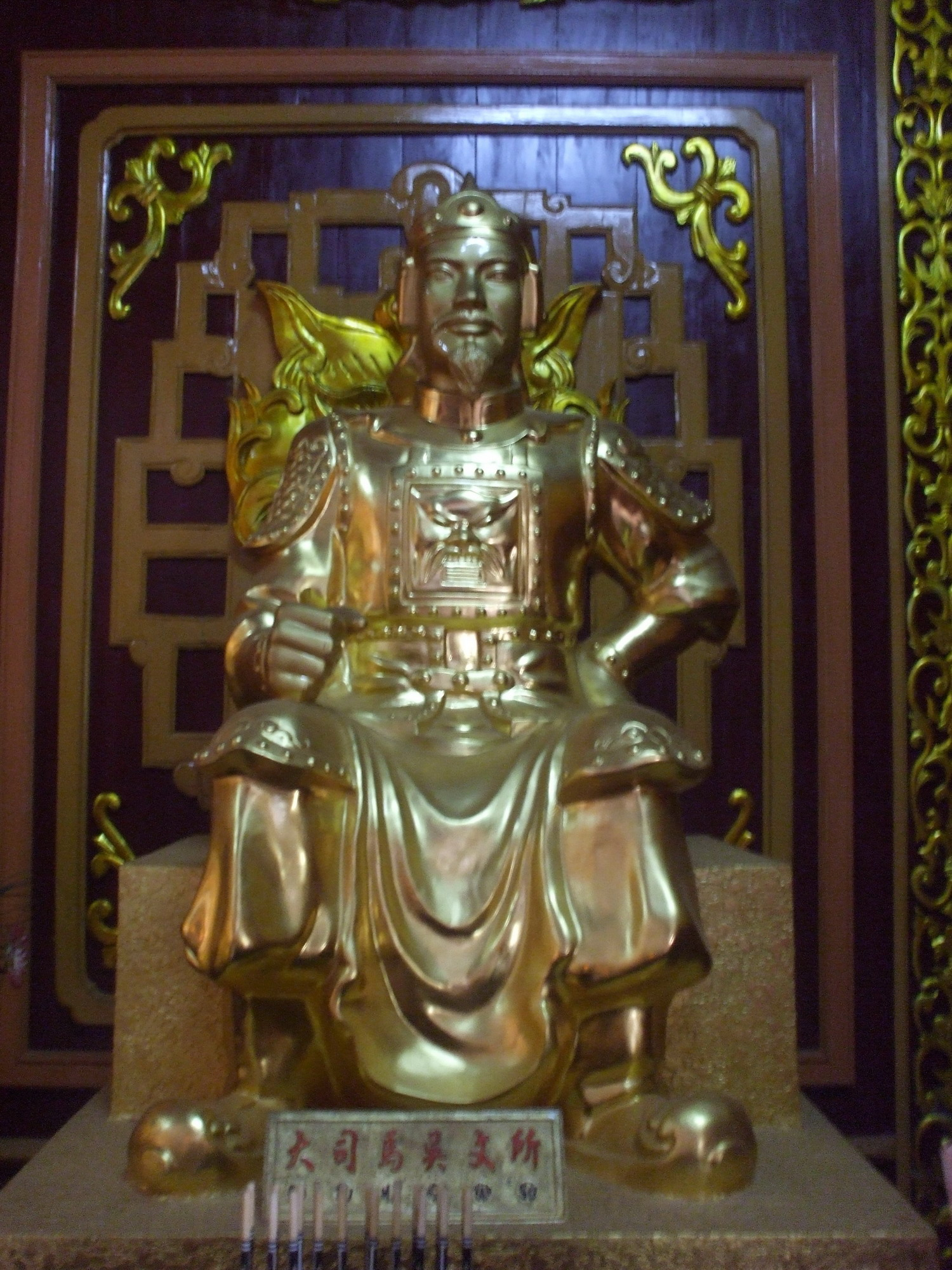
Ngô Văn Sở

Ngô Văn Sở (吳文楚, died 1795) was a general of the Tây Sơn dynasty.

Born in Tuy Viễn District (modern Tây Sơn District), Bình Định Province, he joined the Tây Sơn army at an early age. In 1787, Vũ Văn Nhậm led an army north into Tonkin. Sở and Phan Văn Lân followed the army to assist him. Nhậm occupied Thăng Long (modern Hanoi), executed Nguyễn Hữu Chỉnh, and installed Lê Duy Cận as a puppet "Prince Regent" (監國 giám quốc). Sở and Lân reported Nhậm's actions to emperor Quang Trung, who subsequently had Nhậm executed. The emperor then left Tonkin, leaving Sở, Lân, Nguyễn Văn Tuyết, Nguyễn Văn Dụng, Trần Thuận Ngôn, and Ngô Thì Nhậm in Thăng Long to watch over Cận.

Qing China invaded Vietnam to reinstall the deposed emperor Lê Chiêu Thống of Lê dynasty. Sở ordered Cận to write a letter to the Qing viceroy Sun Shiyi. Describing himself as a popular ruler, Cận tried to persuade Sun to retreat, but his plea was rejected. Realizing the Tây Sơn army could not stop the Chinese army from marching to Thăng Long, Sở accepted Nhậm's suggestion, abandoned Thăng Long, and retreated to Tam Điệp, and sent Nguyễn Văn Tuyết to Phú Xuân (modern Huế) to ask for support.

Huệ and Sở then defeated the Chinese army in the Battle of Ngọc Hồi-Đống Đa. After the war, Huệ attempted to find a peaceful solution with Qing China. Sở was sent to China as a member of the diplomatic corps. Finally, Nguyễn Huệ was recognized as the new ruler of Vietnam by the Qianlong Emperor.

The child emperor Nguyễn Quang Toản ascended the throne in 1792. The following year, Quy Nhơn was attacked by the Nguyễn lords. Nguyễn Nhạc was defeated, and asked for Toản's help. Sở led troops to reinforce Quy Nhơn together with Phạm Công Hưng, Nguyễn Văn Huấn, and Lê Trung, and the Nguyễn army had to retreat.

Sở was a political ally of Bùi Đắc Tuyên. In 1795, Sở was sent to Tonkin to replace Vũ Văn Dũng. Dũng was ordered to return to Phú Xuân, but on the way there, Trần Văn Kỷ persuaded him to stage a coup against Tuyên, who was subsequently arrested and thrown into prison. Sở was arrested by Nguyễn Quang Thùy and taken to Phú Xuân. He was thrown into the Perfume River together with Tuyên and Tuyên's son Bùi Đắc Trụ.
