= Battle of Ngọc Hồi-Đống Đa =

1788-89 battle between Qing China and Tây Sơn-dynasty Vietnam

Qing invasion of Đại Việt
- Part of Tây Sơn wars and Ten Great Campaigns
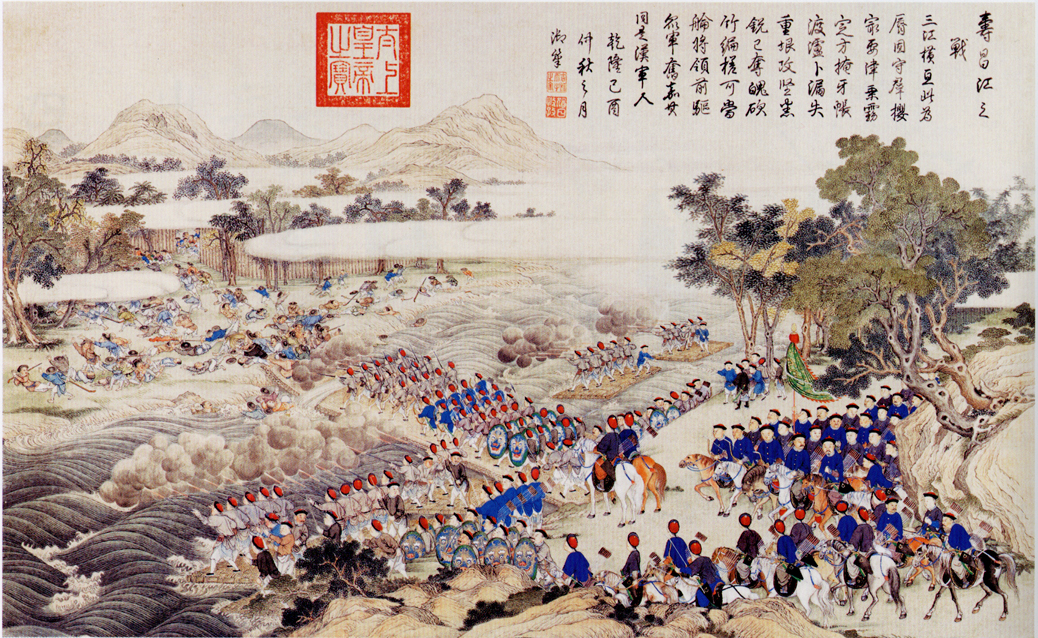
- A depiction of the Battle at the Thọ Xương River (present-day Thương River), engraving, co-produced by Chinese and European painters.
Date	1788 – 1789
Location	Northern Vietnam
Result	Tây Sơn victory.
Territorial changes	Tây Sơn fully controls northern Đại Việt, ending the Later Lê dynasty.: Qing forces withdraw from Đại Việt; The Qing recognizes the Tây Sơn dynasty as the legitimate government of Đại Việt; Tripartite division of Mainland Southeast Asia between Burma, Siam, and Đại Việt is solidified and affirmed.

Belligerents
Qing dynasty Later Lê dynasty	Tây Sơn dynasty

Commanders and leaders
Qianlong Emperor (Qing dynasty) Sun Shiyi (Qing dynasty) Xu Shiheng † (Qing dynasty) Shang Weisheng † (Qing dynasty) Zhang Chaolong † (Qing dynasty) Li Hualong † (Qing dynasty) Qingcheng (Qing dynasty) Wu Dajing (Qing dynasty) Cen Yidong † (Qing dynasty) Tang Hongye; Lê Chiêu Thống; Hoàng Phùng Nghĩa; Lê Quýnh	Nguyễn Huệ; Phan Văn Lân; Ngô Văn Sở; Nguyễn Tăng Long; Đặng Xuân Bảo; Nguyễn Văn Lộc; Nguyễn Văn Tuyết; Đặng Tiến Đông; Phan Khải Đức (surrendered); Nguyễn Văn Diễm; Nguyễn Văn Hòa

Strength
20,000–500,000 Chinese troops (Note: The Chinese strength was disputed. Qing Shilu in the Veritable Records of the Qing mentioned 20,000 Chinese troops. Đại Nam thực lục (Veritable Records of Đại Nam) mentioned 200,000 Chinese troops. According to the Records of the Unification of Annam, Sun Shiyi mentioned that the Chinese-led interventionist army numbered up to 500,000.); Dutton: various, from 36,000 to 300,000. Perdue: 10,000 Chinese and 100,000 Le loyalists (militia); Vietnamese history claims: ~200,000–290,000 regulars and militia See Qing invasion	70,000 (50,000 regulars, 20,000 newly recruited militia); 100–300 battle elephants 350 cannons

Casualties and losses
Charles La Mothe claims: 40,000–50,000 killed? At least 3,400 prisoners	Over 8,000 killed

The Battle of Ngọc Hồi-Đống Đa or Qing invasion of Đại Việt (Vietnamese: Trận Ngọc Hồi - Đống Đa; Chinese: 清軍入越戰爭), also known as Victory of Kỷ Dậu (Vietnamese: Chiến thắng Kỷ Dậu), was fought between the forces of the Vietnamese Tây Sơn dynasty and the Chinese Qing dynasty in Ngọc Hồi (a place near Thanh Trì) and Đống Đa in northern Vietnam from 1788 to 1789. It resulted in the failure of the Chinese to restore the last Lê emperor Chiêu Thống, who had been usurped by the Tây Sơn. It is considered one of the greatest victories in Vietnamese military history.

== Background ==
Since the 17th century Vietnam was divided into two parts: the southern part was Đàng Trong or Cochinchina, ruled by the Nguyễn lords and the northern part was Đàng Ngoài or Tonkin, ruled by the Trịnh lords under the puppet Lê emperors. In 1771 the Tây Sơn rebellion broke out in southern Vietnam, led by the brothers Nguyễn Nhạc, Nguyễn Huệ and Nguyễn Lữ, who removed the local Nguyễn lord from power.

After the capture of Phú Xuân (modern Huế), Nguyễn Hữu Chỉnh, a renegade of Trịnh's general, encouraged Nguyễn Huệ to overthrow the Trịnh lord. Huệ took his advice, marched north and captured Thăng Long (modern Hanoi). In 1788, Lê Chiêu Thống was installed the new Lê emperor by Huệ. Huệ then retreated to Phú Xuân.

However, Nguyễn Hữu Chỉnh became the new regent just like the Trịnh lords before. After learning about the actions of Chỉnh, an army under Vũ Văn Nhậm was sent by Huệ to attack Thăng Long. Chỉnh was swiftly defeated and executed. Lê Chiêu Thống fled and hid in the mountains. Nhậm could not find the emperor, so he installed Lê Duy Cận as a puppet prince regent. Not long after Huệ executed Nhậm, he replaced him with the generals Ngô Văn Sở and Phan Văn Lân.

Meanwhile, Lê Chiêu Thống never abandoned his attempt to regain the throne. Lê Quýnh, Empress Dowager Mẫn and the eldest son of Lê Chiêu Thống, fled to Longzhou, Guangxi, to seek support from Qing China. A large Qing army invaded Vietnam to restore Lê Chiêu Thống to the throne.

What motivated the Qing imperial government to interfere in Vietnam's domestic affairs has always been disputed. Chinese scholars claimed that the Qianlong Emperor simply wanted to restore the Lê emperor and rule all Vietnam, seeking no territorial gains. Vietnamese scholars on the other hand have argued, that Qianlong Emperor intended to make Vietnam a vassal: China would station troops in Vietnam and install Lê Chiêu Thống as its puppet king.

== Qing invasion ==
Two army contingents invaded Vietnam in October of the year Mậu Thân (November, 1788). The Liangguang army under Sun Shiyi and Xu Shiheng marched across the South Suppressing Pass (present day Friendship Pass) and the Yungui army under Wu Dajing marched across the Horse Pass. The two armies aimed to attack Thăng Long directly. According to the Draft History of Qing, a navy had been dispatched from Qinzhou to attack Hải Dương, which, however is not mentioned in Vietnamese records.

The size of the interventionist army was various; according to the Hoàng Lê nhất thống chí, Sun Shiyi allegedly exaggerated that his army numbered up to 500,000. Boisserand, a French missionary, in a letter to MEP on 14 March 1789, claimed that the Chinese army was roughly 36,000 men. The Đại Nam thực lục speaks 200,000 Chinese. Missionary Charles La Mothe gave an estimate for the Chinese force at 300,000 men. Peter C. Perdue gives a figure of 10,000 Chinese and 100,000 Vietnamese Le loyalist militia.

A sizeable force under Sun Shiyi approached Lạng Sơn and in order to put pressure on the Tây Sơn forces, Sun announced that there was a much larger Qing army yet to come. He also promised that who ever helped the Chinese army, would be installed the future regent just like the Trịnh lords before. As a consequence Lê dynasty supporters took up arms against the Tây Sơn army.

The Chinese defeated the Tây Sơn army in Lạng Sơn and Nguyễn Văn Diễm (阮文艷) fled, while Phan Khải Đức (潘啓德) surrendered. The Chinese swiftly pushed further towards the south, threatening the unprepared Tây Sơn army, which dispersed in all directions. Nguyễn Văn Hòa (阮文和) rallied the remnants of the army and occupied Tam Giang, Yên Phong District to confront the Chinese.

Having assessed the situation Ngô Văn Sở ordered Lê Duy Cận to write a letter to Sun Shiyi. Cận described himself as a popular ruler and tried to persuade Sun to retreat, which was rejected by Sun. Realizing the Tây Sơn army could not stop the Chinese army from marching towards Thăng Long, Ngô Thì Nhậm suggested that the Tây Sơn army should retreat to Tam Điệp and seek aid from Phú Xuân (present day Huế). Sở accepted his idea. Troops in Sơn Nam, Sơn Tây and Kinh Bắc retreated to Thăng Long. Sở gathered them, then abandoned Thăng Long and orderly retreated to Tam Điệp. However, Phan Văn Lân did not agree. Lân then led a troop to attack the Chinese army at the Nguyệt Đức River (present day Cầu River), but was utterly beaten by Zhang Chaolong and fled back. Sở concealed the fact. In Tam Điệp, Ngô Văn Sở sent Nguyễn Văn Tuyết to Phú Xuân to ask for aid.

On November 29 (December 16, 1788), the Chinese army marched across the Nhị River (present day Red River). They occupied Thăng Long the next morning without meeting any resistant. On November 24 (December 21, 1788), Sun Shiyi installed Lê Chiêu Thống as "king of Annam" in Thăng Long. Sun regarded himself as the patron of the Lê rulers and looked down upon Lê Chiêu Thống. It was whispered among the Vietnamese that they never had a monarch as unworthy as this before. Lê Chiêu Thống increasingly disappointed his supporters as he reportedly was narrow-minded and exceptionally cruel, who had cut off the legs of his three uncles, who had surrendered to Tây Sơn army before. He had also cut open the wombs of pregnant princesses alive, who had married Tây Sơn generals.

== Tây Sơn reinforcements march north ==
On November 24 (December 21, 1788), Nguyễn Văn Tuyết arrived in Phú Xuân. Nguyễn Huệ declared Lê Chiêu Thống was a national traitor, not qualified for the throne. On the next day, Huệ proclaimed himself Emperor Quang Trung. After the coronation he marched north with about 20,000 soldiers, recruited volunteers while in the Nghệ An Province thereby increasing his force to 100,000 troops. In Thọ Hạc (Thanh Hóa) he inspired his soldiers with an epic address:

Fight to keep our hair long!
Fight to keep our teeth black!
Fight so that our enemies won't have a single wheel to come back!
Fight so that our enemies won't have a single armor to come home!
Fight so that history knows this heroic Southern country is its own master!

His men, encouraged, expressed their approval and quickly marched on. Meanwhile, the Chinese generals had after a few facile victories become overconfident and looked down upon the Tây Sơn army. Huệ, who had noticed it sent an envoy to sue for peace. Sun ordered Huệ to retreat to Phú Xuân, but Huệ ignored.

Huệ arrived in Tam Điệp on December 20 (January 15, 1789). He approved of the idea of Ngô Thì Nhậm's plan. Huệ gathered all forces and divided them into five columns. The main force led by Huệ, marched north to attack Thăng Long directly. A navy led by Nguyễn Văn Tuyết sailed from Lục Đầu River to attack the Lê supporters in Hải Dương. Another navy led by Nguyễn Văn Lộc, sailed from the Lục Đầu River to attack Phượng Nhãn and Lạng Giang. A cavalry contingent (including war elephants) led by Đặng Tiến Đông, marched to attack Cen Yidong in Đống Đa; another cavalry (including war elephants) led by Nguyễn Tăng Long marched past Sơn Tây to attack Xu Shiheng in Ngọc Hồi (a place near the Thanh Trì).

== Battle ==
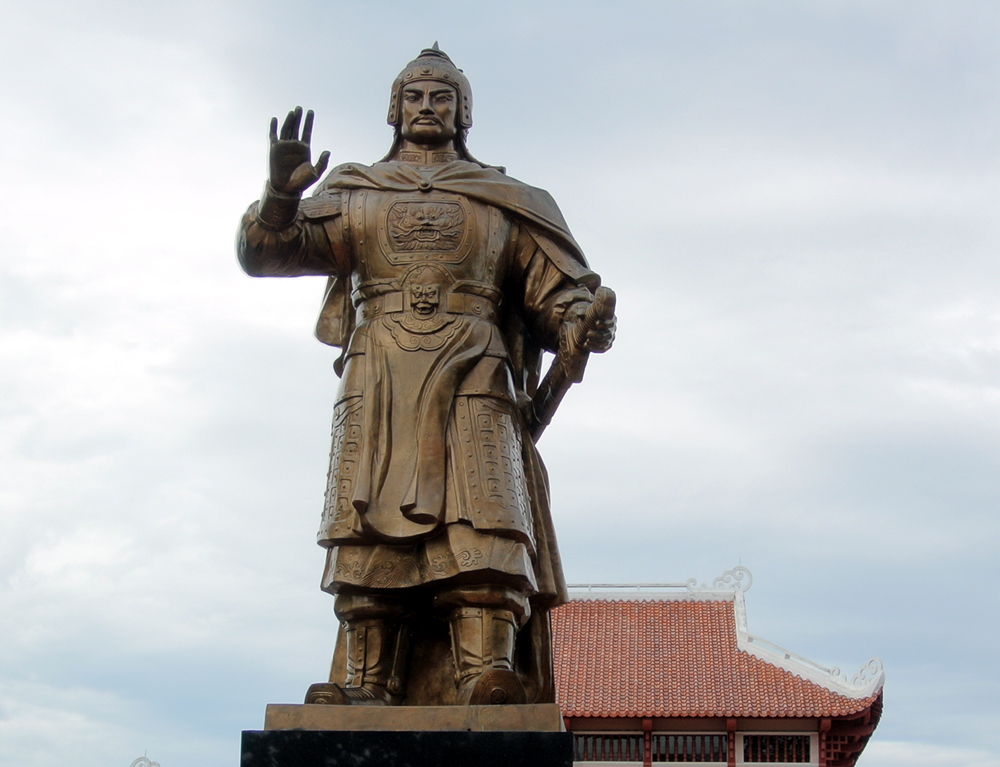
Nguyễn Huệ, the emperor and supreme commander of the Tây Sơn forces

The Qing armies decided to celebrate the Chinese New Year festival and then march further south to capture Phú Xuân (present day Huế) on January 6 of the next year (January 31, 1789). As the Vietnamese New Year (Tết) was generally celebrated on the same day, the Chinese generals assumed that the Tây Sơn army would not attack during the holidays. Subsequent events, however, would prove that they were wrong.

The Tây Sơn army crossed the Giao Thủy River (present day Hoàng Long River in Ninh Bình Province) on New Year's Eve and eliminated all Chinese scouts they encountered on their way. The Tây Sơn army reached Thăng Long during the night of January 3 of the next year (January 28, 1789) and immediately launched a surprise attack on the Chinese, who were celebrating the New Year festival. The Tay Son had surrounded the city, bringing heavy cannons on the back of elephants and breached its forts. Nguyễn Huệ had the Hà Hồi Fort besieged as his soldiers shouted at them to surrender. The Qing army were frightened and dispersed into the night. At dawn of January 5 (January 30, 1789), Huệ besieged the Ngọc Hồi Fort. The Qing army in the fort opened fire at the Tây Sơn army, who attacked the Qing army with big wet wood blocks to protect themselves. Nguyễn Huệ, riding an elephant, inspired his men by fighting in the front. The fort was breached by war elephants and the Tây Sơn entered the fort and fought the Qing army with daggers. They then captured Văn Điển, Đống Đa, An Quyết and other forts. The Qing forces, disastrously defeated, disbanded and fled in confusion. When Sun Shiyi learnt that his army was defeated, he fled with a dozen men, and while crossing the Nhị River (present day Red River) lost his official seal, which was later found by Tây Sơn soldiers and handed to Nguyễn Huệ. Lê Chiêu Thống also fled to China. The Qing generals Xu Shiheng, Shang Weisheng, Zhang Chaolong and Cen Yidong were killed in action. Countless Qing soldiers and supporters drowned while crossing the river, including general Li Hualong.

Đặng Xuân Bảo or Nguyễn Tăng Long was the first general to enter Thăng Long followed by Nguyễn Huệ and his main force and recaptured the city.

The army under Wu Dajing reached Sơn Tây. There, Wu heard that Sun was defeated. Wu decided to retreat to Yunnan. His army was ambushed by the Tày local chief Ma Doãn Dao. However, unlike Sun, most of his soldiers arrived in China safely and was praised by the Qianlong Emperor.

Because of his rapid victory over the Qing interventionists, Nguyễn Huệ was nicknamed by some contemporary missionaries as "new Attila" or "new Alexander."

== Aftermath ==
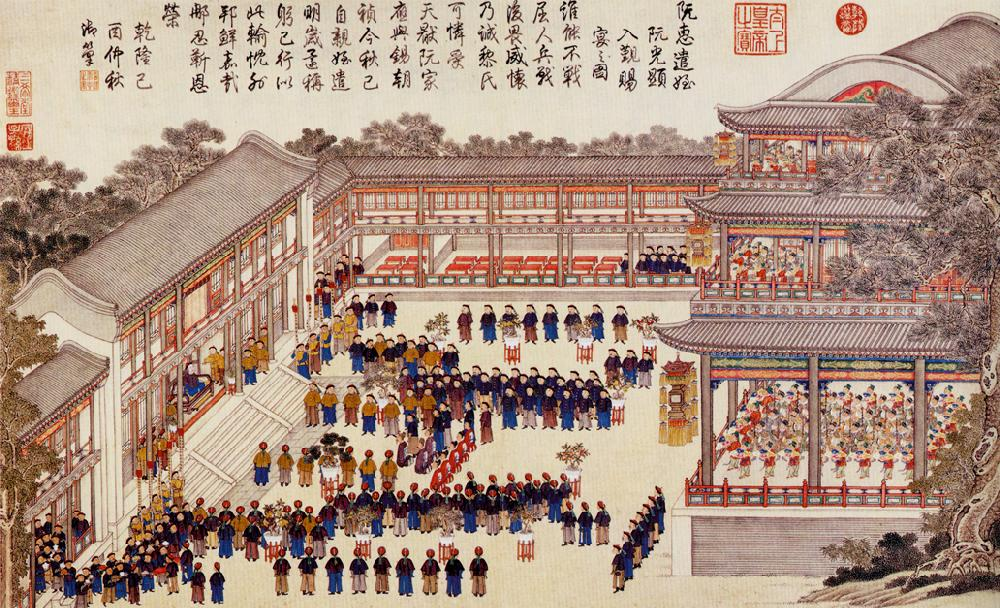
The Qianlong Emperor receiving Nguyễn Huệ's peace envoy Nguyễn Quang Hiển

Seven days later, Sun Shiyi arrived in Guangxi. There, he met Lê Chiêu Thống. According to the Khâm định Việt sử Thông giám cương mục, Sun comforted Lê Chiêu Thống and promised that he would gather new troops and reinstall him. Lê Chiêu Thống and his supporters were accommodated in Guilin.

The irate Qianlong Emperor of the Qing replaced Sun Shiyi with Manchu official Fuk'anggan. Fuk'anggan did not want a conflict with Nguyễn Huệ and he sent a letter to Huệ in which he expressed that a necessary prerequisite for a cease-fire was an apology of Huệ to the emperor. Nguyễn Huệ sought to restore the tributary relationship in order to deter a joint Qing-Siam pincer attack and prevent further Chinese attempts to restore the Lê dynasty. Nguyễn Huệ sent a ritually submissive request to the Qianlong Emperor under the name of Nguyễn Quang Bình (also referred to as Ruan Guangping in Chinese).

In 1789, the Qianlong Emperor agreed to re-establish the tributary relationship and enfeoff Nguyễn Huệ as the king of Annam on the condition that Huệ personally lead a special delegation to Beijing to celebrate the Qianlong Emperor's 80th birthday. For the Qianlong Emperor, the motivation for accepting the arrangement was to retain the Qing's supremacy and stabilize their southern border. Chinese and Vietnamese sources agreed that Nguyễn Huệ sent an imposter with a delegation to Beijing, where they were received with lavish imperial favors. The Qianlong Emperor approved the proposal and bestowed Nguyễn with the title An Nam quốc vương ("King of Annam"). The title indicated that Huệ was recognized as the legal ruler of Vietnam and Lê Chiêu Thống was no longer supported.

Nguyễn Huệ was resentful, trained his army, built large warships and waited for an opportunity to take revenge on Qing dynasty. He also provided refuge to prominent anti-Qing organizations such as the Tiandihui and the White Lotus. Infamous Chinese pirates, such as Chen Tien-pao (陳添保), Mo Kuan-fu (莫觀扶), Liang Wen-keng (梁文庚), Fan Wen-tsai (樊文才), Cheng Chi (鄭七) and Cheng I (鄭一) were granted official positions and/or noble ranks under the Tây Sơn empire. However, the attack never materialized by the time that Quang Trung died in 1792.

After a 1782 massacre of Hoa People was carried out by the Tây Sơn, the support of the domestic Chinese shifted towards to the Nguyễn lords. The Nguyễn lords eventually defeated the Tây Sơn dynasty thanks to Chinese community support, took complete control of Vietnam, and established the imperial Nguyễn dynasty in 1802.

== Cultural influence ==
The Battle of Ngọc Hồi-Đống Đa is considered one of the greatest military victories by the Vietnamese people. In China it holds rank among the "Ten Great Campaigns" that took place during the reign of the Qianlong Emperor.

The Vietnamese victory is seen as the next step after the Burmese Konbaung Dynasty's victory over the Qing Chinese in the earlier Sino-Burmese War. Recorded as a military victory so severe, it has been speculated, that the event might have prevented the Qing from other attempts to invade Southeast Asia. Emperor Quang Trung has since taken his place as an icon of Vietnamese culture. As a national savior he is depicted on the South Vietnamese 200 đồng banknote and temples and streets are named after him.

== Gallery ==
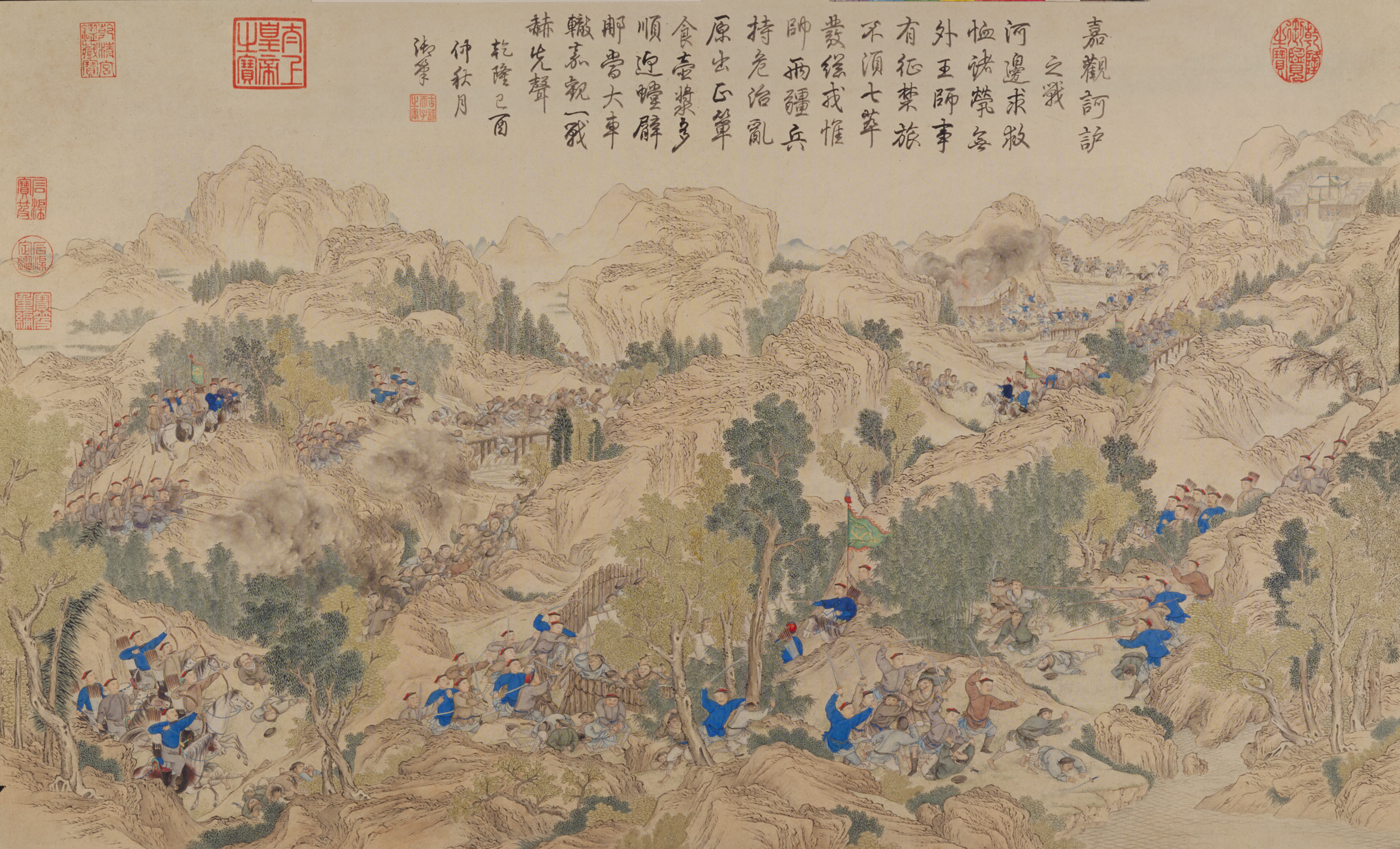
Battle at Gia-quan and Ha-Ho

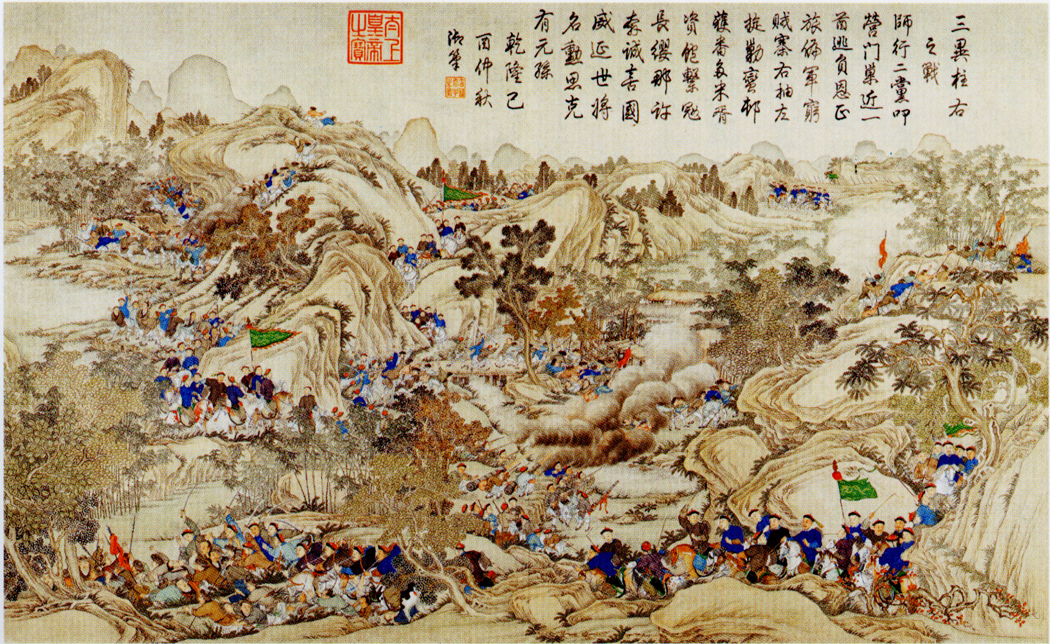
Battle at Tam-dy and Tru-huu

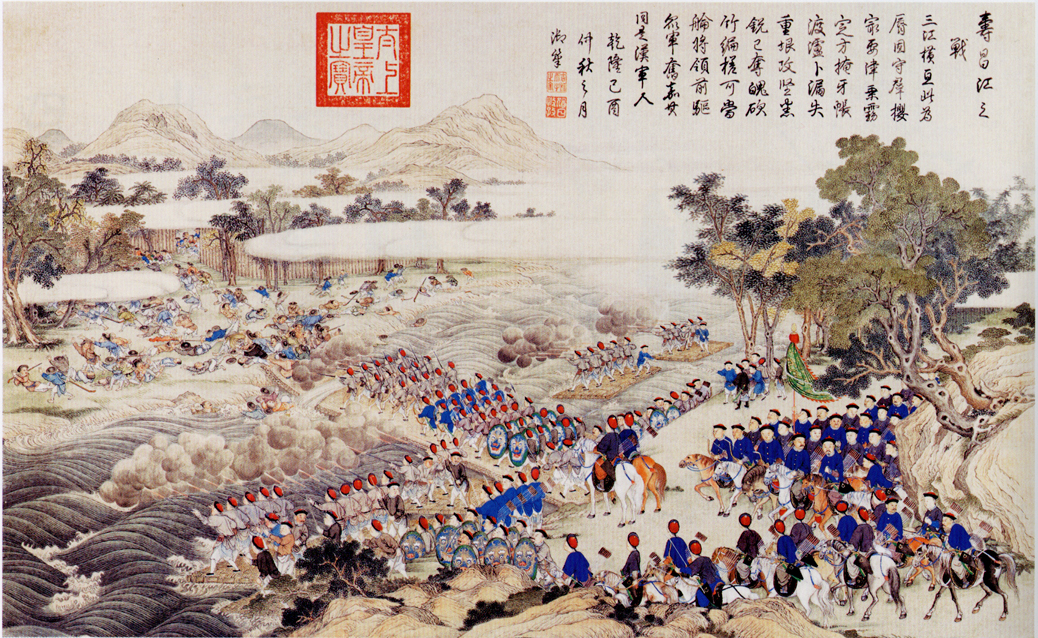
Battle at the River Tho-xuong

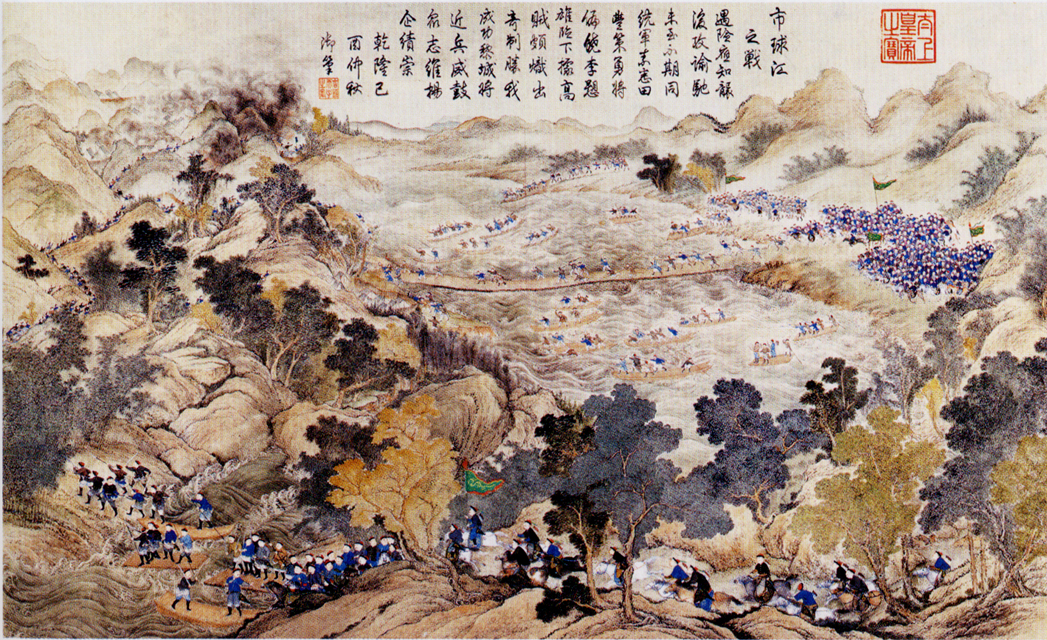
Battle at the River Thi-cau

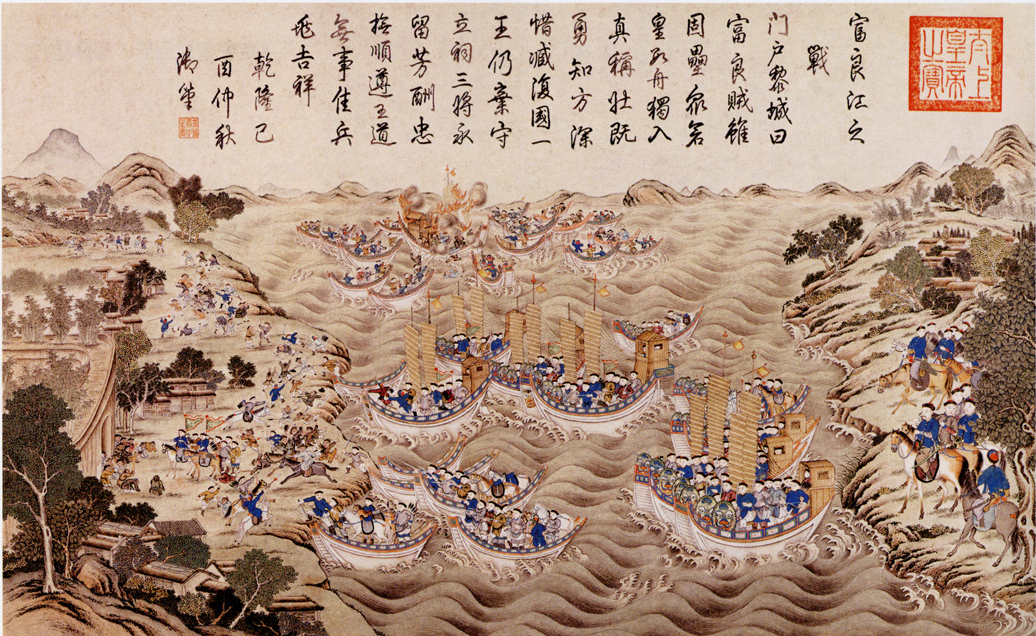
Battle at the River Phu-luong

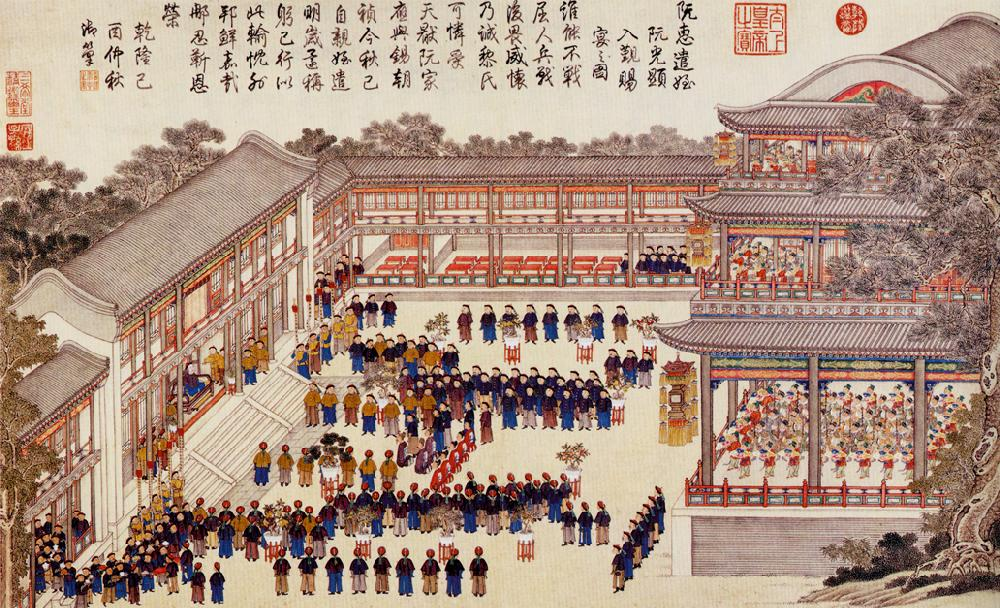
Victory banquet of the emperor to greet Nguyen Quang-Hien, the envoy of Nguyen Hue

== See also ==
- Đống Đa Mound
- Battle of Rạch Gầm-Xoài Mút
- Tây Sơn military tactics and organization
- Ten Great Campaigns
- Draft History of Qing
- Đại Nam thực lục
- Dzungar–Qing Wars
- First and Second Sino–Kazakh War
- Sino-Burmese War (1765–69)
- Sino-Nepalese War
- Ming conquest of Đại Ngu
- Mongol invasions of Vietnam

== Notes ==
Footnotes

Citations

== Bibliography ==
- Tucker, Spencer (1999). Vietnam. Lexington: University Press of Kentucky. ISBN 978-0-8131-0966-4.
- Choi Byung Wook (2004). Southern Vietnam Under the Reign of Minh Mạng (1820-1841): Central Policies and Local Response. SEAP Publications. ISBN 978-0-87727-138-3.
- Dutton, George Edson (2006). The Tây Sơn uprising: society and rebellion in eighteenth-century Vietnam. University of Hawaii Press. ISBN 0-8248-2984-0.
- Perdue, Peter C. (2011), "Embracing victory, Effacing Defeat: Rewriting the Qing Frontier Campaigns", in Larry, Diana (ed.), The Chinese State at the Borders, UBC Press, pp. 105–125, ISBN 978-0-77484-087-3
- Phan Huy Lê (1998). Một số trận quyết chiến chiến lược trong lịch sử dân tộc ta (in Vietnamese). Nhà xuất bản Quân đội Nhân dân.
- Guo Zhenduo; Zhang Xiaomei (2001). Yue nan tong shi (in Chinese (China)). China Renmin University Press. ISBN 978-7-300-03402-7.
