= Xu Shiheng =

Chinese general

Jianyong Baturu Xu Shiheng
- 許世亨
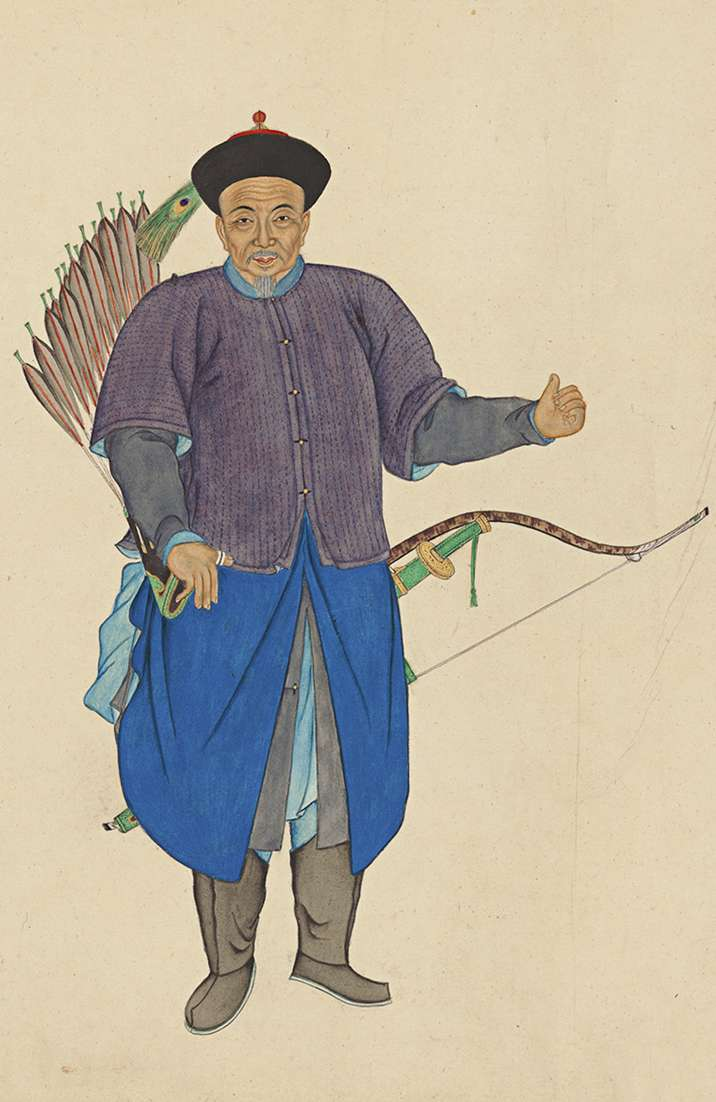

Provincial military commander of Guangxi
- In office 1788–1789

Personal details
- Born: Unknown Xindu, Qing China
- Died: 1789 Thăng Long, Đại Việt
- Occupation: general

Military service
- Allegiance: Qing dynasty
- Rank: General
- Battles/wars: Lin Shuangwen rebellion Battle of Ngọc Hồi-Đống Đa †

Xu Shiheng (simplified Chinese: 许世亨; traditional Chinese: 許世亨; pinyin: Xǔ Shìhēng; Wade–Giles: Hsü Shih-heng; Vietnamese: Hứa Thế Hanh; died 1789) was a general in the Qing dynasty.

== Biography ==
=== Early career ===
Xu, a Hui Muslim from Xindu, Chengdu, took part in the Imperial martial art exams and later served in the wars in Tibet and Taiwan. Having originally served as a mounted cavalry soldier, he was awarded to the position of Bazong (7th rank General) of the Green Standard Army, before getting promoted to the position of Shoubei (5th rank General) a few years later. In 1771, the second Jinchuan campaigns took place as the Qing sought to suppress the ethnic rebellion in the territory; Xu Shiheng was dispatched to the frontline, where he gained fame with his military achievements, thus promoted him to the Peacock rank (3rd General) of Lieutenant-General. After Jinchuan was pacified in 1776, Xu won promotion to the rank of 2nd General in Tengyue in Yunnan before becoming the General of Weining in Guizhou.

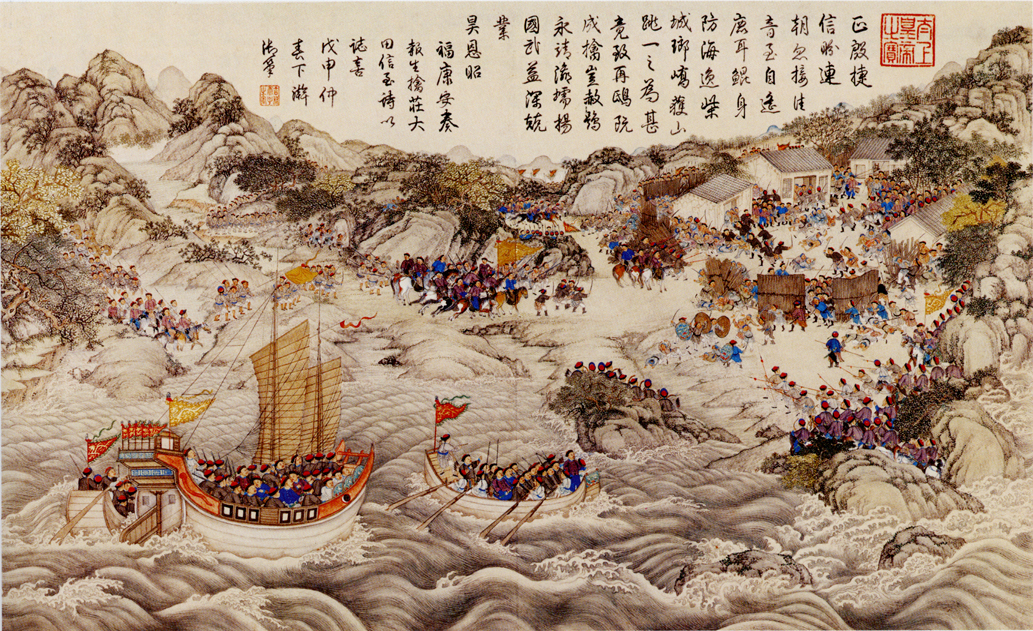
The capture of Zhuang Datian in 1787. Xu Shiheng personally took part on the capture.

In 1787, a major rebellion broke out in Taiwan. Xu Shiheng was sent to the island to capture the rebels' leader, Lin Shuangwen. His military merit was further enhanced by his ferocious conquest and ability to convince the local population to join his rank against the rebels. During the conquest, he managed to capture another rebels' leader, Zhuang Datian, in a combined effort using the navy and the land force. After the rebellion was ended in 1788, Emperor Qianlong wrote his essay, praising Xu Shiheng for his contribution and awarded him the title "Jianyong Baturu". He was later appointed Governor of Guangxi before being appointed for the job as the Governor of Zhejiang.

=== Death ===
Before he could take up the rank as Zhejiang Governor, however, news broke out that the Tây Sơn rebellion reached northern Vietnam and toppled the Later Lê dynasty. Maximising from the ongoing chaos in Đại Việt and pleas from the last King of the dynasty, Lê Chiêu Thống, Qianlong authorised an expedition to Vietnam, in which Xu obliged to follow under the lead of Sun Shiyi. This decision proved to be costly for his life, as in the Chinese New Year of 1789 (25 January), Nguyễn Huệ suddenly launched a major assault. There, the Qing army suffered a massive military loss and frantically escaped from the Vietnamese capital to the north, during which Xu Shiheng decided to make his last stand at the Red River to allow his superior to escape, ultimately died in the battlefield. Xu Shiheng himself had warned Sun Shiyi about the deception trap by the Tây Sơn army earlier but was not heard.

Shocked by the death of Xu, Emperor Qianlong posthumously awarded Xu the third-class heroic earl and gave the title of "Zhaoyi" to him and had his portrait carried to the Zhaozhong Temple's altar to worship.

His son, Xu Wenmo, also gained fame with his bravery and had once worked as Governor of Guangdong. His descendants would later spread in the country and still living today, one of which would be the general Xu Shiyou (simplified Chinese: 许世友; traditional Chinese: 許世友), one of the founders of the People's Liberation Army who also personally took part in the Chinese invasion of Vietnam in 1979.
