= Phan Văn Lân =

Tây Sơn dynasty general

Phan Văn Lân (潘文璘, 1730–?) was a general of the Tây Sơn dynasty.

He joined the Tây Sơn army in an early time. In 1787, Vũ Văn Nhậm led an army marching north into Tonkin. Lân and Ngô Văn Sở followed the army to assist him. Nhậm occupied Thăng Long (modern Hanoi), had Nguyễn Hữu Chỉnh executed, and installed Lê Duy Cận as a puppet "Prince Regent" (監國 giám quốc). Sở and Lân regarded it as treason, and reported Nhậm's actions to Nguyễn Huệ. Huệ led an army marched north and had Nhậm executed. Huệ retreated from Tonkin, and left Ngô Văn Sở, Phan Văn Lân, Nguyễn Văn Tuyết, Nguyễn Văn Dụng, Trần Thuận Ngôn, and Ngô Thì Nhậm in Thăng Long to watch Cận.

Qing China invaded Vietnam to reinstall the deposed emperor Lê Chiêu Thống of Lê dynasty. Ngô Văn Sở decided to retreat, but was opposed by Lân. He then led a troop to attack the Chinese army in Nguyệt Đức River (modern Cầu River), but was utterly beaten and fled back to Thăng Long. Sở concealed the fact and retreated to Tam Điệp, and sent Nguyễn Văn Tuyết to Phú Xuân (modern Huế) to ask support.

Huệ then led an army marching north, and defeated the Chinese army in the battle of Ngọc Hồi and Đống Đa. Lân also played an important role in this battle.
