= Lê Duy Cận =

- Prince Regent of Đại Việt

Prince Regent of Revival Lê dynasty
- Reign: 1787 - 1788
- Predecessor: Lê Chiêu Thống (as emperor)
- Successor: none
- Born: ? Thăng Long, Đại Việt
- Died: ?
Names
- Lê Duy Cận (黎維𬓑)
- House: Revival Lê dynasty
- Father: Lê Hiển Tông

Lê Duy Cận (chữ Hán: 黎維𬓑, ?–?) or Lê Duy Cẩn, was a Vietnamese prince during Revival Lê dynasty.

Cận was the second son of Lê Hiển Tông. In 1769, his elder brother, Lê Duy Vĩ, was stripped of his position as Crown Prince and imprisoned by Trịnh Sâm. In the same year, Cận was proclaimed as the new Crown Prince. In 1782, Trịnh Khải staged a coup and came into power, Cận was deposed and granted the title Sùng Nhượng Công (崇讓公).

In 1787, Tây Sơn general Vũ Văn Nhậm led an army to attack Thăng Long (modern Hanoi). Lê Chiêu Thống, the successor of Lê Hiển Tông, fled to Bảo Lộc mountain, and Nhậm could not find him. In order to gain popularity among Northern Vietnamese, Nhậm install Cận as "Prince Regent" (監國 giám quốc), but very few people support them. Every day he walked to Nhậm's camp to discuss national affairs, and Nhậm did not know how to deal with the relationship between them. Cận got the nickname from common people, đề-lại giám-quốc (提吏監國), which means "the prince regent like a petty official".

The actions of Vũ Văn Nhậm was reported to Nguyễn Huệ by Ngô Văn Sở and Phan Văn Lân. Huệ led an army marched north and had Nhậm executed. Huệ retreated from northern Vietnam, Cận remained his position, Sở and Lân were left in Thăng Long to watch him. Lê Quýnh, a supporter of Lê Chiêu Thống, described that Cận was "a silly man".

Qing China invaded Vietnam to reinstall the deposed emperor Lê Chiêu Thống. Ngô Văn Sở ordered Cận to write a letter to the Qing viceroy Sun Shiyi. Cận described himself as a popular ruler and tried to persuade Sun to retreat. But it was rejected by Sun. On 22 December 1788, Nguyễn Huệ proclaimed himself emperor Quang Trung and formally declared that the Lê dynasty had ended. Huệ then led an army march north, defeated the Qing army, and banished Lê Chiêu Thống again. Cận's name was not mentioned in the later history records.

Preceded by Lê Chiêu Thống as emperor	Prince Regent of Lê dynasty 1787–1788	Succeeded by Quang Trung of the Tây Sơn dynasty Lê dynasty abolished
