= Nguyễn Văn Hòa =

Nguyễn Văn Hòa may refer to:

- Nguyễn Văn Hòa (Tây Sơn) (阮文和), a general of the Tây Sơn Dynasty in Vietnamese history
- Paul Nguyễn Văn Hoà (1932 - 2017), a Bishop, musician Catholic Vietnamese
