= Nguyễn Quỳnh =

Nguyễn Quỳnh (1677-1748) was a well-known intellectual in the Lê–Trịnh (Emperor Lê Hiển Tông). he passed the examination as “Hương Cống” (Bachelor), so he was often referred to as Cống Quỳnh. He was known for his glamour, humor that created many anecdotes. Because of this, he was often called as Trạng Quỳnh.

Nguyễn Quỳnh was born in Bột Thượng village, Hoàng Lộc commune, Hoàng Hòa district, Thanh Hóa province. His parents are Nguyễn Bổng and Nguyễn Thị Hương. In his early years, he studied with his grandfather and his father (who was a student in Quốc Tử Giám). In 1696, he passed the Nguyên examination, but failed many times in Hội examination. Even though he did not pass high examinations, Nguyễn Quỳnh is still known for his outstanding education, At the time, there was a saying that: "Nguyễn Quỳnh, Nguyễn Nham, thiên hạ vô tam" (meaning that people do not have a third as good as the two of them).

In honor of him, the Vietnamese government built the memorial house in his homeland and named a street in Ho Chi Minh City after him.
