= Lê Quýnh =

Lê Quýnh (chữ Hán: 黎, 1750–1805) was a Vietnamese mandarin during Revival Lê dynasty.

In 1787, a Tây Sơn general, Vũ Văn Nhậm, marched north to attack the capital Thăng Long (now Hanoi). After the fall of Thăng Long, Lê Chiêu Thống, the emperor of Lê dynasty, fled to Bảo Lộc mountain, and sent Quýnh to seek aid from the Qianlong Emperor of Qing China. Qing army invaded Vietnam to reinstall the deposed emperor, but was defeated by Nguyễn Huệ, the emperor of Tây Sơn dynasty.

After this war, Nguyễn Huệ was recognized as the new ruler of Vietnam by Qianlong Emperor, and Lê Chiêu Thống did not manage to receive aid from Qing China any more. Fuk'anggan, the Viceroy of Liangguang, forced Lê Chiêu Thống and his followers to cut off their hair and change to Manchurian attire. Only Quýnh refused to do, and said: "Our heads can be cut off, but hairs cannot; skins can be flayed, but attires cannot be changed." He was imprisoned in Guangxi. He was not allowed to return to Vietnam until 1804.

== Works ==
- Bắc hành tùng ký
- Bắc sở tự tình phú
