= Phạm Văn Trị =

Vietnamese general of the Tây Sơn dynasty

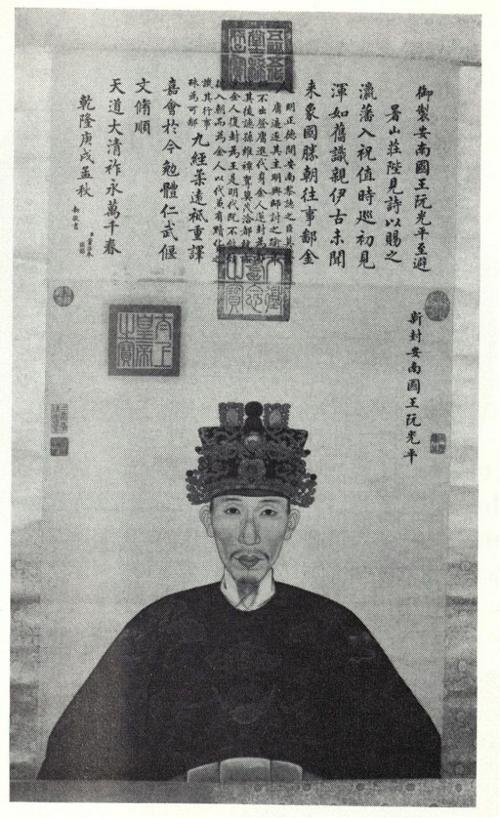
a portrait of Phạm Văn Trị (the political decoy of Nguyễn Huệ) by an imperial artist of the Qing dynasty.

Phạm Văn Trị (范文治, ?–?) or Phạm Công Trị (范公治), later Nguyễn Văn Trị (阮文治), was a general of Tây Sơn dynasty, Vietnam. He was the second son of Phạm Công Hưng.

Nguyễn Huệ defeated the Chinese army in the battle of Ngọc Hồi and Đống Đa in 1789, but Huệ decided to submit himself as vassal of Qing China and agreed to pay tribute annually, otherwise, Tây Sơn dynasty would fall in a two-front war with both Qing China and Siam.

In order to gain support from Qing China, Nguyễn Huệ promised that he would go by himself to have an audience with Qianlong Emperor, despite Huệ not wanting to go at all. Finally, Phạm Văn Trị was chosen as the political decoy and went to China. He reached Beijing, then to Chengde Mountain Resort, to celebrate Qianlong's eightieth birthday. Qianlong was very happy, and recognized Nguyễn Huệ as the ruler of Vietnam. Qianlong granted a lot of gifts to him. Before he returned to Vietnam, Qianlong ordered an imperial artist to draw a portrait of him as a gift.

Soon after he returned, he was granted the rank of Quận công ("provincial duke") and the royal family name "Nguyễn", and married a daughter of Nguyễn Huệ.

In 1801, Nguyễn Ánh attacked the capital Phú Xuân (modern Huế). Nguyễn Văn Trị led a troop in Qui Sơn Hill, and built a fence to defend the Nguyễn army. Lê Văn Duyệt and Lê Chất launched a night raid and finally defeated him. He fled to Trường Hà. There, he was captured by the Nguyễn army.
