= Ngô Thì Nhậm =

Vietnamese Buddhist monk and writer

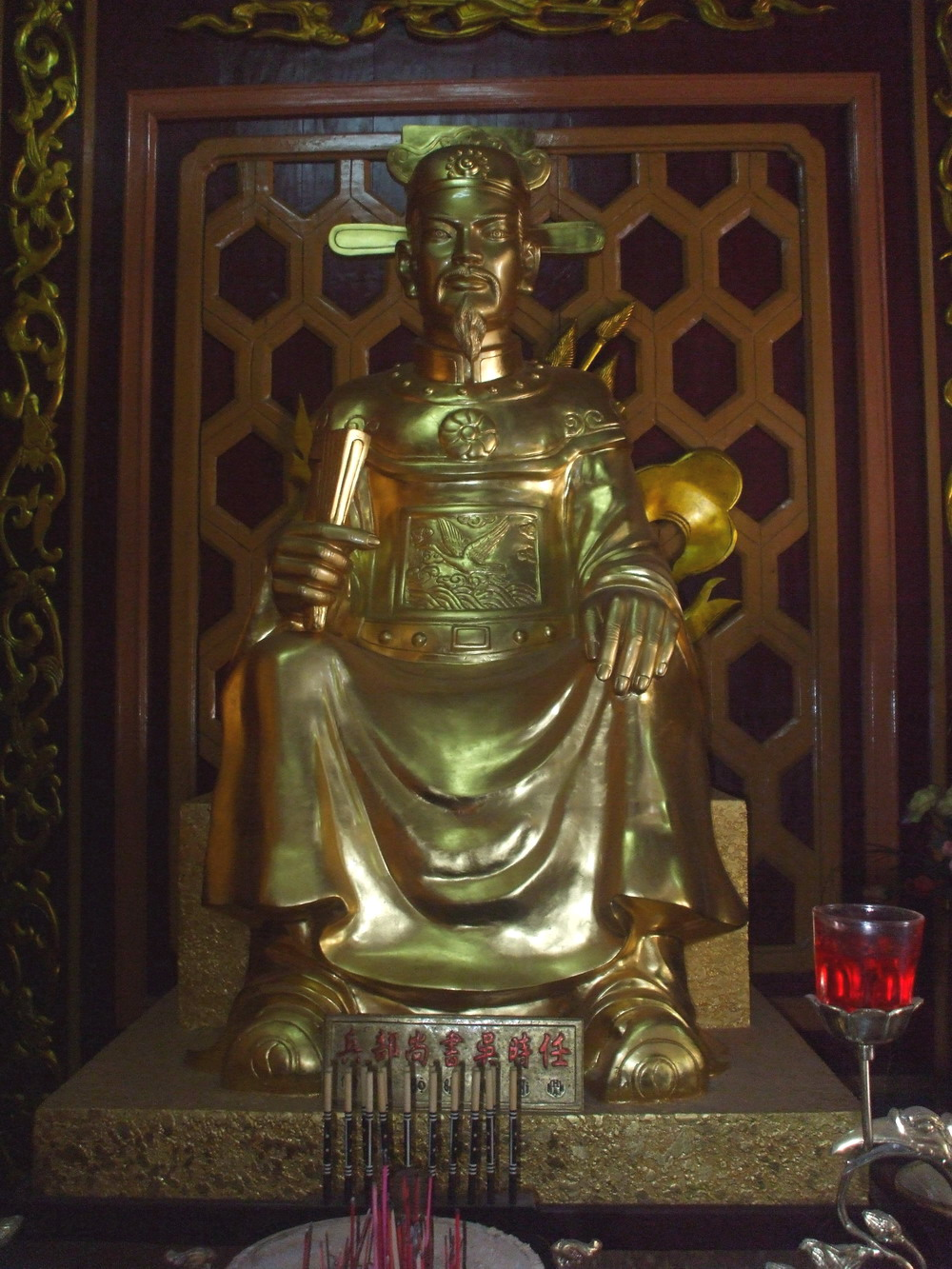
Statue of Ngô Thì Nhậm

Ngô Thì Nhậm or Ngô Thời Nhiệm (chữ Hán: 吳時任, 1746–1803) was an important Vietnamese scholar and official who served several regimes during the turbulent last decades of the eighteenth century. He had served as an official for the Trịnh lords before losing his position as a result of a coup that followed the death of the Trịnh lord Trịnh Sâm in 1782.

He retreated from public life, focusing on his scholarship, before being lured back to official service by the Tây Sơn leader, Nguyễn Huệ in the late 1780s. He served the Tay Son regime with enthusiasm during the reign of the Quang Trung Emperor (r. 1788-1792), writing edicts for the Tây Sơn court, and serving as an emissary to the Chinese court.

After the unexpected death of the Quang Trung Emperor and the ascent to the throne of an underage son, Ngô Thì Nhậm slowly decreased his service to the court, and turned his attention to an interest in Vietnamese Buddhism. He became noted for his writings on Vietnamese Buddhism, and was actively involved in attempting to revive the 13th Century Trúc Lâm ("Bamboo Grove") zen sect, the only native Vietnamese school of Buddhism. The revival attempted to harmonize the "Three teachings" of Buddhism, Confucianism and Taoism. After the defeat of the Tây Sơn by the resurgent Nguyễn family in 1802, Ngô Thì Nhậm was captured and publicly flogged by a vengeful Nguyễn official, dying shortly thereafter from the injuries sustained in the beating.
