= Lê Hiển Tông =

Emperor of Đại Việt from 1740 to 1786

Lê Hiển Tông 黎顯宗
- Emperor of Đại Việt
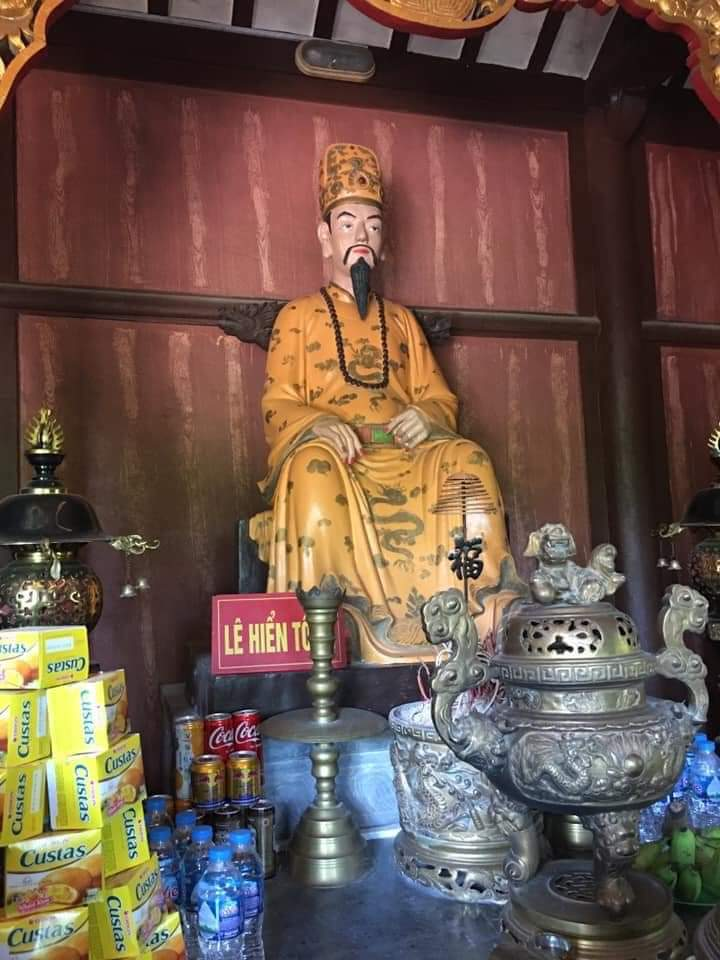

Emperor of the Revival Lê dynasty
- Reign: 1740–1786
- Predecessor: Lê Ý Tông
- Successor: Lê Chiêu Thống
- Regent: Trịnh Doanh (1740–1767); Trịnh Sâm (1767–1782); Trịnh Cán (1782); Trịnh Tông (1782–1786)
- Born: 20 May 1717; Đông Kinh, Đại Việt
- Died: 10 August 1786 (aged 69); Đông Kinh, Đại Việt
Names
- Lê Duy Diêu (黎維祧)
Era name and dates
- Cảnh Hưng (景興): 1740–1786
Posthumous name
- Vĩnh Hoàng đế (永皇帝)
Temple name
- Hiển Tông (顯宗)
- House: Revival Lê dynasty
- Father: Lê Thuần Tông
- Mother: Nhu Thuận hoàng hậu

Lê Hiển Tông (chữ Hán: 黎顯宗; 20 May 1717 – 10 August 1786), born Lê Duy Diêu, was the penultimate emperor of the Vietnamese Lê dynasty. He reigned from 1740 to 1786 and was succeeded by his grandson Lê Duy Kỳ.

At the time Vietnam was under the power of the Trịnh lords. During the reigns of Lê Thuần Tông (1732–1735) and Lê Ý Tông (1735–1740), Trịnh Giang ruled Vietnam with the title Uy Nam Vương, but he was deposed in 1740 due to poor leadership. From 1740 to 1767, Trịnh Doanh ruled with the title Minh Do Vương in the first part of the reign of Lê Hiển Tông. He was followed by Trịnh Sâm, who ruled from 1767 to 1782 with the title Tinh Do Vương. At this point the Lê dynasty began to regain its power.

== Issue ==
He had twenty-three children, including:

- Crown prince Lê Duy Vĩ, executed by the Trịnh lords in 1771
- Lê Duy Cận (died after 1786)
- Princess Lê Thị Ngọc Hân
- Princess Lê Thị Ngọc Bình

== Sources ==
- Nguyẽ̂n, Phút Tá̂n (1964). A Modern History of Viet-nam (1802–1954). Khai-Trí. pp. 134–135.
- Tucker, Spencer (1999). Vietnam. Lexington: University Press of Kentucky. pp. 17–18. ISBN 0-8131-0966-3.

Preceded by Lê Ý Tông	Emperor of Vietnam; 1740–1786	Succeeded by Lê Chiêu Thống
