= Nguyễn Hữu Chỉnh =

18th century Vietnamese court official

Nguyễn Hữu Chỉnh (chữ Hán: 阮有整, 1741–1788) was an official during the Revival Lê dynasty in Vietnam.

Chỉnh was a disciple of Hoàng Ngũ Phúc. He had been sent to Tây Sơn as a diplomat. Nguyễn Nhạc admired him for his eloquence. Later, Chỉnh became Hoàng Đình Bảo's right hand. In 1782, Bảo was killed by Trịnh Khải, and Chỉnh fled to Tây Sơn. In 1786, he encouraged Nguyễn Huệ to march north. Trịnh lord was overthrown by Huệ. Lê Hiển Tông, the emperor of Lê dynasty, met Huệ in the palace. Chỉnh suggested that Huệ should recognise the dominance of Lê dynasty in northern Vietnam (Đàng Ngoài), and marry with Princess Lê Ngọc Hân. Huệ accepted, and Tây Sơn retreated from northern Vietnam, but Huệ regarded Chỉnh as a traitor to Trịnh lord, and left him in northern Vietnam. Chỉnh thus had to stay in his birthland, Nghệ An Province.

Trịnh lords members took advantage of Nguyễn Huệ's absence. Two Trinh heirs, Trịnh Bồng and Trịnh Lệ (鄭棣), appeared and made their claims to the lord throne. Northern Vietnam fell into chaos. Lê Chiêu Thống, the successor of Lê Hiển Tông, asked for assistance from Chỉnh. Chỉnh led an army marching north, and easily defeated the Trinh army, forcing Trịnh Bồng to flee and capturing Thăng Long (modern Hanoi). Chỉnh was elevated to Đại Tư Đồ (大司徒 Minister over the Masses) and granted the title Bằng Trung công (鵬忠公 Duke of Bằng Trung), and became the de facto ruler of northern Vietnam just like Trịnh lords before.

After learning about actions of Chỉnh, Nguyễn Huệ sent north a general named Vũ Văn Nhậm with an army to attack Thăng Long. Chỉnh was swiftly defeated and fled together with Lê Chiêu Thống. He was captured by Nhậm, and executed in Thăng Long.
