= Vũ Văn Nhậm =

Tây Sơn dynasty general

- Died: 1788
- Allegiance: Tây Sơn dynasty

Vũ Văn Nhậm (武文任, ?–1788) was a general of Tây Sơn dynasty.

At first Nhậm was a low-ranking officer of Nguyễn lord. Later, he committed a crime and had to join Tây Sơn army. Nguyễn Nhạc appreciated his bravery, and married a daughter to him.

In 1788, Nhậm was sent north to arrest Nguyễn Hữu Chỉnh by Nguyễn Huệ. Ngô Văn Sở and Phan Văn Lân followed the army to assist him. Actually, Sở and Lân were sent to watch him. Chỉnh was swiftly defeated and fled together with Lê Chiêu Thống. Later, Chỉnh was captured and executed, but Nhậm could not find Lê Chiêu Thống. In order to gain popularity among Northern Vietnamese, Nhậm install Lê Duy Cận as "Prince Regent" (監國 giám quốc), but very few people support them. Every day he walked to Nhậm's camp to discuss national affairs, and Nhậm did not know how to deal with the relationship between them. Sở and Lân regarded it as treason, and reported Nhậm's actions to Nguyễn Huệ. Huệ led an army marched north, and launched a night raid. Sở and Lân opened the gate to let them in. Nhậm was captured and executed.
