= Sun Shiyi =

Qing dynasty official and Viceroy of Liangguang and Liangjiang

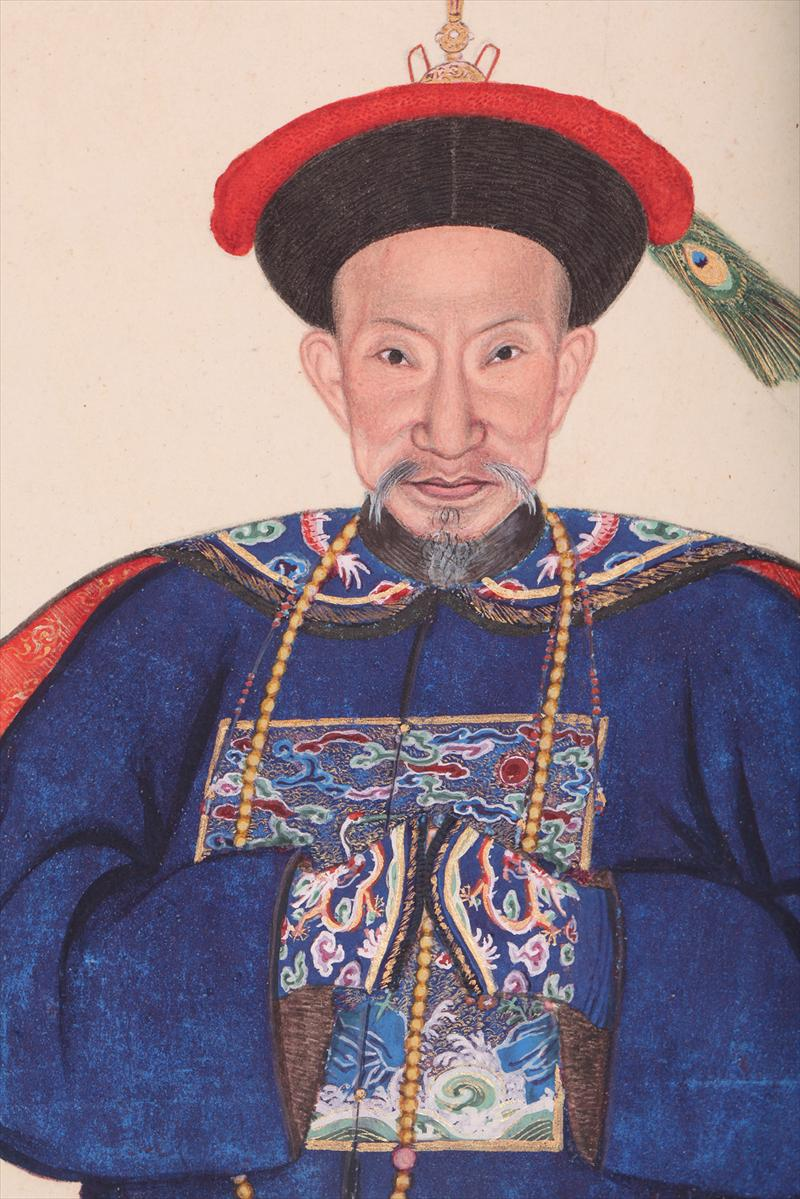

Grand Councillor
- In office 6 August 1789 – 27 December 1789

Grand Secretary of the Wenyuan Library
- In office 8 October 1792 – 10 August 1796

Viceroy of Liangjiang
- In office 5 June 1790 – 25 May 1791

Viceroy of Liangguang
- In office 23 May 1786 – 19 February 1789
- In office 27 April 1785 – 6 August 1785

Minister of Personnel
- In office 25 May 1791 – 22 September 1792

Viceroy of Sichuan
- In office 10 August 1796 – 10 August 1796
- In office 27 December 1789 – 5 June 1790

Assistant Grand Secretary
- In office 20 May 1791 – 22 September 1792

Minister of War
- In office 3 April 1789 – 5 June 1790

Personal details
- Born: 1720 Hangzhou, Zhejiang
- Died: 10 August 1796 (aged 75–76) Laifeng County, Hubei

Sun Shiyi (simplified Chinese: 孙士毅; traditional Chinese: 孫士毅; pinyin: Sūn Shìyì; Wade–Giles: Sun Shih-i, Vietnamese: Tôn Sĩ Nghị; 1720 – 10 August 1796), courtesy name Zhizhi (智冶), pseudonym Bushan (補山), was an official of the Qing dynasty who served as the Viceroy of Liangguang and of Liangjiang during the reign of the Qianlong Emperor.

A native of Renhe (present-day Yuhang District, Zhejiang), as a youth, Sun was devoted to study and was said to have prevented drowsiness by knocking his head against a wall. Awarded a jinshi degree in the imperial examination in 1761, he was secretary to Fuheng during his Burmese expedition, and in 1770 had risen to be Treasurer of Guangxi, when he was cashiered for want of energy, and orders were given to confiscate his property. Struck with the fact that nothing was found to confiscate, the Qianlong Emperor re-employed him.

In 1788, as Viceroy of Liangguang, he invaded Annam and reinstalled the emperor Lê Chiêu Thống, who had fled in fear of the rebel Nguyễn Huệ. No sooner had the Chinese withdrawn than another revolution took place, and it was ultimately decided to leave Annam alone. He was sent to Sichuan to see the supplies of the army fighting in Tibet, into which country he advanced over terrible mountains as far as Chamdo. In 1792, on the conclusion of the war with Nepal, the suppression of the White Lotus Rebellion occupied his last days. His physical powers were marvellous, and he required hardly any sleep. He was a great collector of ancient inscriptions. He was ennobled as Duke Mouyong of the First Class (一等謀勇公).
