= Lê Chiêu Thống =

Last emperor of the Later Lê dynasty

Chiêu Thống Emperor 昭統帝
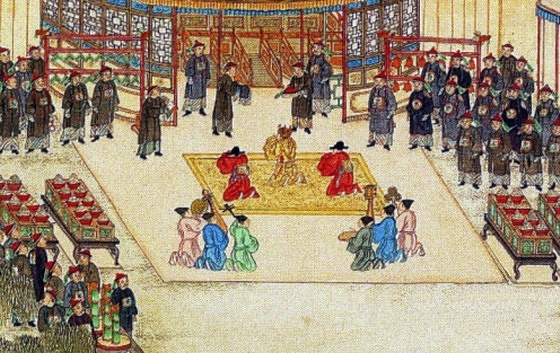
- Qing Chinese officials receiving deposed Vietnamese emperor Lê Chiêu Thống (Yellow robe)

Emperor of Đại Việt
- Reign: 1786–1789
- Predecessor: Lê Hiển Tông
- Successor: Quang Trung of the Tây Sơn dynasty
- Regent: Trịnh Bồng (1786–1787)
- Born: 1765; Đông Kinh, Đại Việt
- Died: 1793 (aged 27–28); Beijing, Qing China
- Burial: November 1804; Bàn Thạch village, Thanh Hoa, Việt Nam
Names
- Lê Duy Khiêm (黎維); Lê Duy Kỳ (黎維祁)
Era dates
- Chiêu Thống (昭統)
Posthumous name
- Mẫn Hoàng đế (愍皇帝)
- House: Lê dynasty
- Father: Lê Duy Vĩ
- Mother: Empress Dowager Mẫn

- Reign name
- Vietnamese alphabet: Lê Chiêu Thống
- Chữ Hán: 黎昭統

- Personal name
- Vietnamese alphabet: Lê Duy Kỳ
- Chữ Hán: 黎維祁

Lê Chiêu Thống (黎昭統, 1765–1793), born Lê Duy Khiêm and later Lê Duy Kỳ, was the last emperor of the Vietnamese Later Lê dynasty. He was overthrown by the Tây Sơn dynasty. He appealed to the Qing dynasty of China to help regain the throne but failed after losing the Battle of Ngọc Hồi-Đống Đa. Afterwards, he no longer received support from the Qing Qianlong Emperor, relatives of the Later Lê imperial family were imprisoned in Vietnam, and he died in China. Furthermore, the Qianlong emperor banished the remaining members of the Lê family to border regions of the Qing dynasty such as Xinjiang and Heilongjiang.

== Early life ==
Lê Duy Khiêm was the eldest son of Lê Duy Vĩ who was the first crown prince of emperor Lê Hiển Tông. After Khiêm's father was killed by the ninth Trịnh lord Trịnh Sâm in 1771, he was jailed. In 1783, lord Trịnh Khải deposed crown prince Lê Duy Cận and made Lê Duy Khiêm crown prince of the Lê dynasty.

== Succession and reign ==
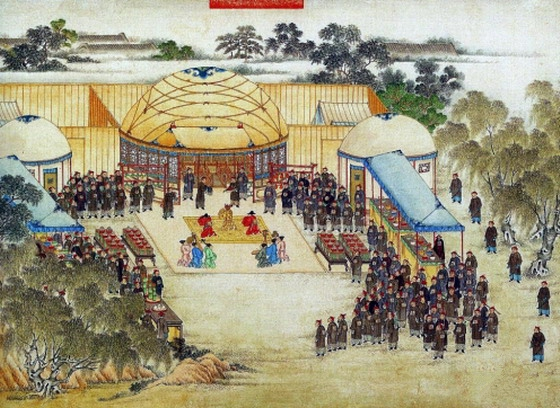
Chinese officials receiving the deposed Le Chieu Thong

In 1786, the Tây Sơn general Nguyễn Huệ led his force to northern Vietnam and destroyed the house of the Trịnh lords. The next year, 1787, the Lê emperor Lê Hiển Tông died of natural causes, and Nguyễn Huệ installed Lê Duy Khiêm on the throne as emperor Lê Chiêu Thống and then he withdrew almost all his troops to Phú Xuân. Trịnh Lords members took advantage of Nguyễn Huệ's absence. Two Trinh heirs, Trịnh Bồng and Trịnh Lệ, appeared and made their claims to the lord throne. emperor Lê Chiêu Thống appointed Trinh Bong as the next Trịnh lord which triggered Trịnh Lệ to revolt. After suppressing Trịnh Lệ forces, Trịnh Bồng became the most powerful man in north Vietnam but his leadership was bad. The entirety of north Vietnam sank into chaos, thus forcing King Lê Chiêu Thống to ask for assistance from Nguyễn Hữu Chỉnh, Tây Sơn governor of Nghệ An. Nguyen Huu Chinh led an army marching north, easily defeating the Trinh army, forcing Trinh Bong to flee and capturing Thăng Long. After pacifying the region, Nguyen Huu Chinh abused power for his own interests, thus impinging Nguyễn Huệ's political status.

- Birth name
- Vietnamese alphabet: Lê Duy Khiêm
- Chữ Hán: 黎維

After learning about the actions of Nguyễn Hữu Chỉnh, Nguyễn Huệ sent north a general named Vũ Văn Nhậm with an army to attack Thăng Long (now Hanoi). Vu Van Nham swiftly defeated and killed Nguyen Huu Chinh and occupied Thăng Long, but then he took the power himself. Nguyễn Huệ sent two other generals to suppress Vu Van Nham and recaptured Thăng Long. Meanwhile, Lê Chiêu Thống fled to the furthest north of Vietnam and refused Nguyễn Huệ's invitations to return. He gathered a small army of Lê dynasty loyalists and sent his family to China to seek aid from the Qianlong Emperor of the Qing Empire. The Qianlong Emperor agreed and sent a massive army to north Vietnam. Under the banner of the Lê king, the large Qing army easily drove Tây Sơn out of north Vietnam and took over Thăng Long. After the Qing occupation of northern Vietnam, the Qing viceroy Sun Shiyi^{[a]} reinstalled Lê Chiêu Thống as a puppet ruler. Although Lê Chiêu Thống did not have much ruling power, he began taking a bloody revenge on Tây Sơn supporters and forced people to supply him food in spite of war and famine.

The actions of Lê Chiêu Thống and the Qing invasion gave Nguyễn Huệ a good chance to officially take the throne and gain popularity among northern Vietnamese people. On 22 December 1788, Nguyễn Huệ proclaimed himself emperor Quang Trung and formally declared that the Lê dynasty had ended. He then led an army march north. Although the Tây Sơn army was smaller, they defeated the unprepared Qing troops in a series of battles during the 1789 Lunar New Year celebration and forced the rest of the Qing army to flee in confusion. Lê Chiêu Thống fled to China which marked the end of the Lê dynasty.

Lê Chiêu Thống and high ranking Lê loyalists fled Vietnam for asylum in Qing China and went to Beijing. Lê Chiêu Thống was appointed a Chinese mandarin of the fourth rank in the Han Yellow Bordered Banner, while lower ranking loyalists were sent to cultivate government land and join the Green Standard Army in Sichuan and Zhejiang. They adopted Qing clothing and the queue hairstyle, effectively becoming naturalized subjects of the Qing dynasty affording them protection against Vietnamese demands for extradition. Modern descendants of the Lê monarch live in southern Vietnam.

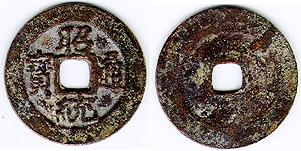
Coins issued under the reign of Lê Chiêu Thống

== Exile and death ==
After the war, Nguyễn Huệ sent a request of recognition to China and it was accepted with conditions. The Qing Empire recognized Nguyễn Huệ as a new ruler of Vietnam and gave him the traditional title "An Nam Quốc Vương" (King of An Nam). From this point on, Lê Chiêu Thống did not receive any more support from the Qing Empire of China. He spent the rest of his life in China, and died in 1793.

In 1802, when envoys of the Nguyễn dynasty visited China, Lê dynasty loyalists requested that the Jiaqing Emperor let them bring Lê Chiêu Thống's remains back to Vietnam and the emperor agreed. The Jiaqing Emperor also freed all the followers of Lê Chiêu Thống who were imprisoned in China.

Lê Chiêu Thống's remains are buried in Bàn Thạch village, Thanh Hóa, Vietnam. He was posthumously given the title Mẫn Đế (愍帝).

== Notes ==
a. Chinese: 孫士毅. Vietnamese: Tôn Sĩ Nghị.

== Bibliography ==
- Dang Viet Thuy; Dang Thanh Trung (2008). 54 vị Hoàng đế Việt Nam (54 Emperors of Vietnam) (in Vietnamese). Hanoi: Quan Doi Nhan Dan Publishing House.
- Trần Trọng Kim (2005). Việt Nam sử lược (A Brief History of Vietnam) (in Vietnamese). Ho Chi Minh City: Ho Chi Minh City General Publishing House.
- Chapuis, Oscar (1995). A History of Vietnam: From Hong Bang to Tu Duc. Greenwood Publishing Group. ISBN 0-313-29622-7.
- Tucker, Spencer (1999). Vietnam. Lexington: University Press of Kentucky. ISBN 0-8131-0966-3.
- Dutton, George Edson (2006). The Tây Sơn uprising: society and rebellion in eighteenth-century Vietnam. University of Hawaii Press. ISBN 0-8248-2984-0.
- Ooi, Keat Gin (2004). Southeast Asia: a historical encyclopedia, from Angkor Wat to East Timor. ABC-CLIO. ISBN 1-57607-770-5.
- Kim, Jaymin (2023). "The Rise and Fall of a Qing-Lê Alliance, 1788–1804: A Case Study on the Praxis of Sino-Vietnamese Relations". Journal of Vietnamese Studies. 18 (3): 98–133. doi:10.1525/vs.2023.18.3.98.

Preceded by Lê Hiển Tông	Emperor of Vietnam; 1786–1789	Succeeded by Quang Trung of the Tây Sơn dynasty Lê dynasty abolished
