= Pirates of the South China Coast =

18th to 19th century Chinese pirates

Pirates of the South China Coast (traditional Chinese: 華南海盜; simplified Chinese: 华南海盗; pinyin: huá nán hǎi dào) were Chinese pirates who were active in the north-western coasts of the South China Sea from the late 18th century to the 19th century, mainly during a 20-year period from 1790 to 1810. After 1805, the pirates of the South China Coast entered their most powerful period. Many pirates were fully trained by the Tây Sơn dynasty of Vietnam.

== History ==
Chinese pirate flag with the bagua and taijitu, captured by George Henry Preble. Circa 1871

Since the late 18th century, with the increase of the population, land annexation was becoming serious day by day. Many farmers lost their land, they became brigands or pirates. Giang Bình (present-day Jiangping town in Dongxing, Fangchenggang, Guangxi, China) was known as a pirate hotbed at that time.

In early times, Chinese pirates were mostly fishermen. They came to Giang Bình by boat to do business, though the private maritime trade was restricted by the Chinese government. Giang Bình is located near the China–Vietnam border; it belonged to Vietnam since the Lý dynasty, later, it was ceded to China after the end of the Sino-French War. Giang Bình was a melting pot of Vietnamese and Chinese, it had a strategic location; however, this area was neglected by the Vietnamese government.

The Tây Sơn Rebellion broke out in Southern Vietnam in 1771. The rebellion soon swept Nguyễn lords and Trịnh lords out of power. Many Chinese pirates were hired as mercenaries and joined the civil war. Tập Đình and Lý Tài became generals of the Tây Sơn army. He Xiwen (Hà Hỉ Văn) became a general of Nguyễn Ánh.

Nguyễn Huệ, one of Tây Sơn leaders, became Emperor Quang Trung and defeated the invading Chinese army in 1789. After the battle, Huệ reconciled with China, however, he waited for an opportunity to take revenge on China. He provided money to Chinese pirates. Three prominent pirates, Chen Tianbao, Mo Guanfu and Zheng Qi, were ordered to hire more pirates. Since 1790, the number of Chinese pirates grew rapidly. Most of them pledged loyalty to the Tây Sơn dynasty, and were fully trained. Many pirates were granted official positions. They were able to block sea routes and harassed the coastlines of South China (Guangdong, Fujian, Zhejiang, Jiangsu) frequently. Later, they also took part in all important naval battles against Nguyễn Ánh.

In 1801, the Nguyễn navy reached Phú Xuân, a naval battle broke out in the Nộn estuary (present-day Thuận An estuary). Many Chinese pirates were hired by Tây Sơn to fight against Nguyễn lord. Jean-Baptiste Chaigneau described that it was the fiercest battle in the history of Cochinchina. The battle ended with a near annihilation of both the Tây Sơn navy and Chinese pirates. Three important pirates, Mo Guanfu, Liang Wengeng and Fan Wencai, were captured by Nguyễn lord. Emperor Cảnh Thịnh fled to Thăng Long (present-day Hanoi), from where he was planning a counter-attack. Most pirates did not support the Tây Sơn dynasty and instead secretly fled back to China. Chen Tianbao fled to Guangdong and surrendered to China. Zheng Qi still pledged loyalty to Emperor Cảnh Thịnh. In 1802, he arrived at Thăng Long. He was appointed as Đại Tư Mã ("Grand Marshal") by Cảnh Thịnh. Zheng Qi got involved in the siege of Đồng Hới, but his fleet was defeated in the estuary of the Nhật Lệ River.

Tây Sơn dynasty was overthrown by the Nguyễn dynasty. Unlike Tây Sơn emperors, the new crowned Gia Long started to suppress the pirates. In September 1802, the Nguyễn army destroyed the pirates' lair in Giang Bình, captured Zheng Qi and had him executed.

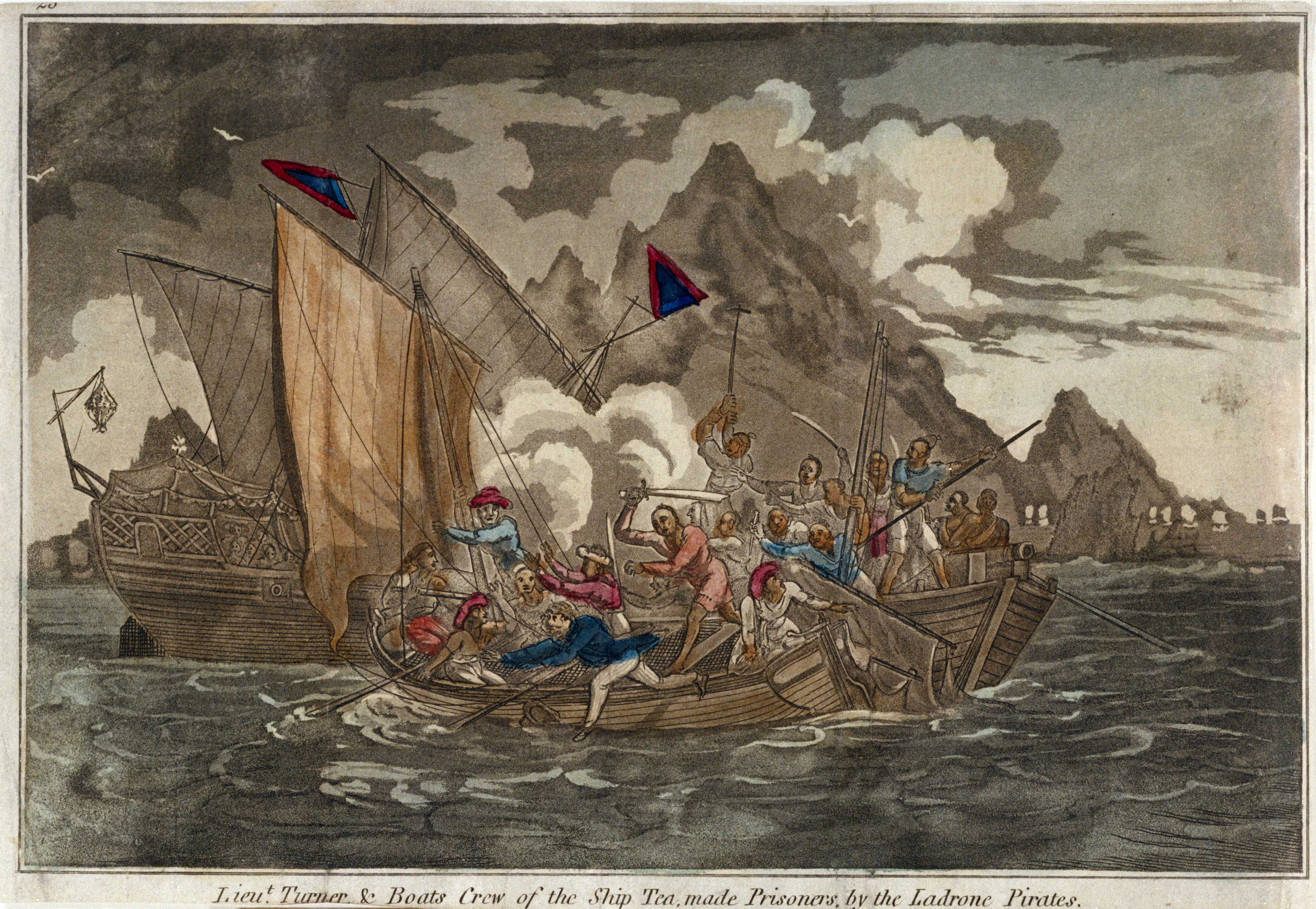
Lieutenant Turner and the crew of the ship Tay, made prisoners by the Ladrone Pirates

After this incident, Chinese pirates had to flee to Guangdong. To compete for turf, they attacked each other. Finally, they found it would just destroy themselves. In 1805, seven pirate leaders made an agreement and the Guangdong Pirate Confederation was founded. The seven leaders were: Zheng Yi (Red Flag Fleet), Guo Podai (Black Flag Fleet), Liang Bao (White Flag Fleet), Jin Guyang (Green Flag Fleet), Wu Shi'er (Blue Flag Fleet), Wu Zhiqing (Yellow Flag Fleet) and Zheng Laotong. Not long after, Zheng Laotong surrendered to the Chinese government, which left six fleets in the alliance. The Red Flag Fleet led by Zheng Yi was the strongest of the fleets in the alliance, and he was selected the leader of the alliance. Ladrones Islands (present-day Wanshan Archipelago), Hong Kong and Leizhou Peninsula became pirate hotbeds.

Zheng Yi died suddenly in Vietnam on 16 November 1807. His widow Ching Shih, became the new leader of the Red Flag Fleet. Later, Ching Shih re-married and adopted Cheung Po Tsai as her son, Cheung became the new leader of the alliance, which made Guo Podai resentful.

Now the Red Flag Fleet had 30,000 men and several hundred vessels, it became a big threat to Qing China and Portuguese Macau. In September 1809, Cheung was attacked by the Portuguese Navy in the Tiger's Mouth. In November, Cheung was besieged by Chinese-Portuguese Navy in Chek Lap Kok. Cheung asked for Guo Podai's help, however, Guo refused. In a day of fog, Cheung fled from the battlefield. He was furious at Guo and vowed revenge on him. A navy battle between the Red Flag Fleet and the Chinese navy broke out in December, in the battle, Cheung was ambushed by Guo's Black Flag Fleet, and defeated. Several vessels of Cheung were captured by Guo. After the battle, Guo surrendered to the Chinese government and became an official of the Chinese navy.

Hearing the news, Cheung refused to surrender. However, more and more pirates surrendered. In January 1810, Cheung was persuaded to surrender. He delivered his fleet and weapons on 20 April. Cheung became a Chinese naval officer. On 24 May, a combined Chinese-Vietnamese navy was dispatched to suppress the remnants of pirates. Cheung and Guo took part in the battle. The main part of the pirate fleet was destroyed in the battle. It marked the end of Chinese pirates' era.

On 26 June, 1857, Chinese pirates defeated the Portuguese in the Ningpo massacre.

=== Battles ===
- Battle of the Tiger's Mouth (September 1809 - January 1810) - battle between Chinese pirates and Portugal during the Qing dynasty, Portuguese victory
- Battle of Tysami (28–29 September 1849) - battle between the British and Chinese pirates, British victory
- Battle of Tonkin River (October 20–22, 1849) - battle between the Qing Dynasty, Nguyễn dynasty, and the British versus Chinese Pirates, British/Sino/Tonkinese victory
- Battle of Nam Quan (May 10, 1853) - battle between the Qing Dynasty and the British versus Chinese pirates, Sino-British victory
- Battle of Muddy Flat (April 3-4, 1854) - battle between the British, U.S.A., and Taiping Small Swords Society versus the Qing Dynasty and their Chinese Pirate allies, Anglo-American-Sino Victory
- Battle of the Leotung (August 19, 1855) - battle between the British and Chinese pirates, British victory
- Ningpo massacre (26 June 1857) - battle between Cantonese pirates hired by the Qing Dynasty and Portuguese Pirates during the Qing dynasty, Cantonese pirate victory

== Prominent pirates ==
- Chen Tien-pao
- Mo Kuan-fu
- Cheng Chi
- Liang Wen-keng
- Fan Wen-tsai
- Ho Hsi-wen
- Lun Kuei-li
- Zheng Yi
- Zheng Yi Sao
- Cheung Po Tsai
- Shap-ng-tsai
- Ah Pak

== See also ==
- Piracy in the Strait of Malacca
- Thalassocracy
