= Chui A-poo =

Chinese pirate

- 徐亞保
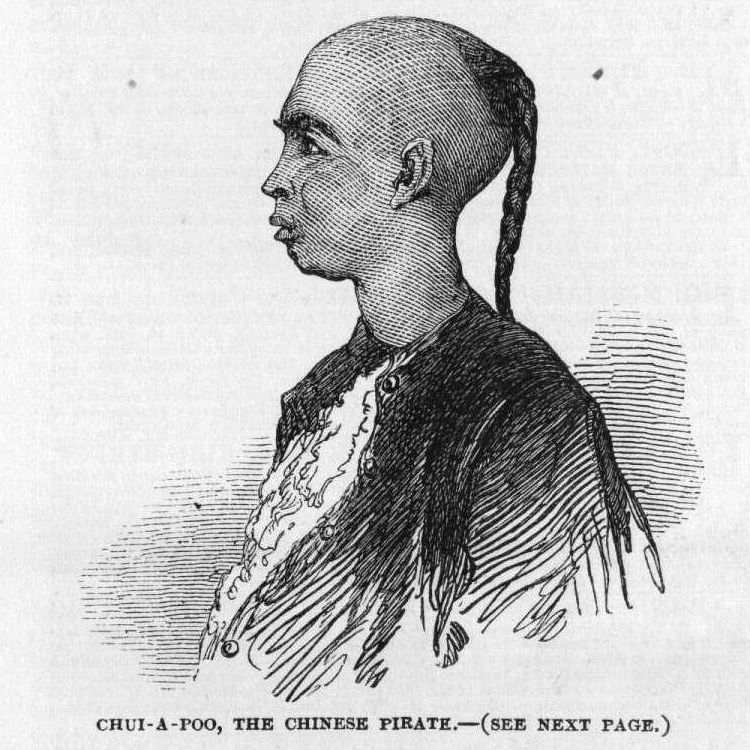
- Born: Stanley, Hong Kong
- Died: 1851; Victoria Prison, British Hong Kong
- Piratical career
- Type: Pirate
- Years active: mid-1800s
- Rank: fleet commander
- Base of operations: South China Sea
- Commands: 50 ship Chinese fleet

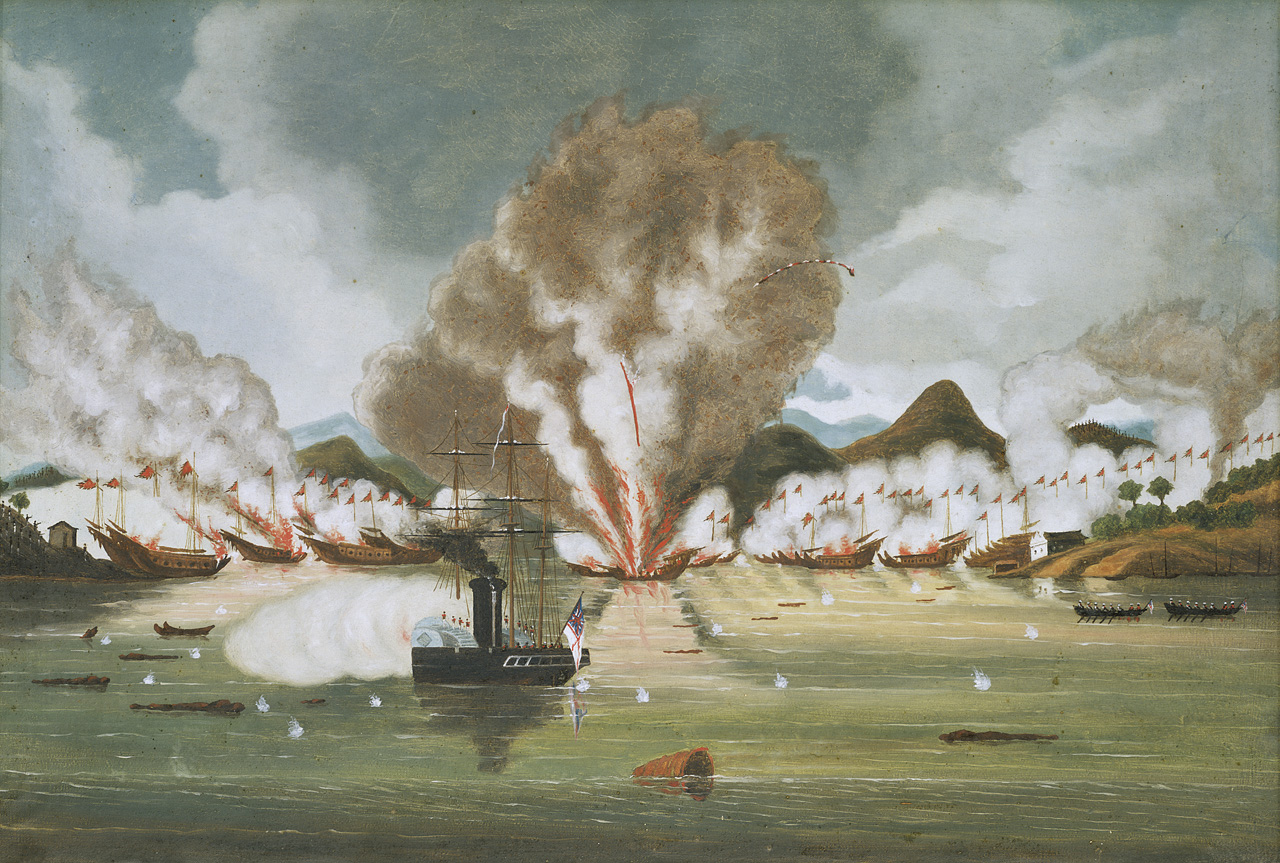
Destruction of Chuiapoo's Pirate Fleet, 30 September 1849

Chui A-poo (Chinese: 徐亞保; died 1851), also referred to as Chui Apo, was a 19th-century Qing Chinese pirate who commanded a fleet of over 50 junks in the South China Sea. He was regarded as one of the two most notorious South China Sea pirates of the era, along with Shap-ng-tsai.

He is said to have lived in Wong Ma Kok village of Stanley, where Wong Ma Kok Road lies now, for more than a decade. On 25 February 1849, Chui killed two British officers, Captain Da Costa and Lieutenant Grantham. A bounty of £500 was placed on his capture.

From September to early-October 1849, his fleet, based in Bias Bay east of Hong Kong, was defeated by British warships. John Dalrymple-Hay led the British fleet included HMS Columbine, HMS Hastings, and HMS Fury, along with Canton, a borrowed ship from P&O. More than 400 pirates were killed in the Battle of Tysami. Although he and Shap-ng-tsai managed initially to escape to Haikou, Hainan, John Dalrymple-Hay continued the pursuit after searching ports south of Hong Kong. British warships then cooperated with the Chinese navy, and on 20 October, 58 pirate ships were destroyed and Chui was severely wounded in the Battle of Tonkin River. Shap-ng-tsai subsequently surrendered. In 1851, Chui was captured by other pirates near Hong Kong and handed over to the British authorities on 17 February.

He was convicted of manslaughter. His sentence was lifelong exile to Van Diemen's Land (now Tasmania), but he hanged himself in his cell before it could be carried out. His trial was a milestone for the judiciary system of Hong Kong. George Bonham hired a defense attorney with public fund for Chui, a first in Hong Kong's history.

== See also ==
- Battle of Tysami

== Notes and references ==
- Is the namesake of the One Piece character Scratchman Apoo.
