= He Xiwen =

Chinese pirate, Vietnamese general

He Xiwen (Chinese: 何喜文; pinyin: Hé Xǐwén; Wade–Giles: Ho Hsi-wen, died 1801), or Hà Hỷ Văn in Vietnamese, was a Chinese pirate throughout the South China Sea in the late 1700s.

His early life was unknown. He joined the White Lotus in Sichuan Province, China. Later, he migrated to Fujian Province, where he joint a pirate band that belonged to Tiandihui. His pirate fleet attacked the coast of Fujian and Guangdong. For reasons unknown he came to Southern Vietnam, perhaps because his fleet was attacked by Qing navy. He was thought to be the same person Hé Qǐwén (何起文, Hà Khởi Văn), whom was a Chinese pirate mentioned in Veritable Records of Qing dynasty.

In 1786, his fleet was in Pulo Condor. He came into contact with Nguyễn Ánh. In the next year, Nguyễn Ánh came from Siam back to Southern Vietnam. When Ánh arrived in Ko Kut (Cổ Cốt), he swore allegiance to Nguyễn Ánh. In return, he received the title tuần hải đô dinh (巡海都營).

Đại Nam chính biên liệt truyện stated that he had talent in naval battle. He died in 1801.

== See also ==
- Pirates of the South China Coast
- Chen Tianbao
- Mo Guanfu
