= Lun Guili =

Chinese pirate, Vietnamese general

Lun Guili (simplified Chinese: 伦贵利; traditional Chinese: 倫貴利; pinyin: Lún Gùilì; Wade–Giles: Lun Kuei-li, died 1800) or Luân Quý Lợi in Vietnamese, was a Chinese pirate throughout the South China Sea in the late 1700s.

Born in Chenghai County, Guangdong Province (present-day Chenghai District, Shantou, Guangdong). His birth name was Wang Guili (王貴利, Vương Quý Lợi in Vietnamese). He was hired by Chen Tianbao and joint his pirate band in 1794. Lun swore allegiance to Tây Sơn dynasty. After three years of service, he received the title Thiện tàu đội đại thống binh Tiến Lộc hậu (善艚隊大統兵進祿侯, lit. "Commander in chief of the Virtuous Fleet, Marquess Tiến Lộc") from Tây Sơn dynasty.

In 1800, Lun's pirate fleet attacked the coast of Fujian and Zhejiang. His fleet suffered whe hit by a typhoon in Zhejiang, most of the ships were wrecked near Huangyan County (present-day Huangyan District, Taizhou, Zhejiang). The survivors had to get ashore, but were ambushed by Qing army. Lun was captured, he pretended to be mute, but Chinese government officials found his official seal in his vessel. The official seal proved that he was also a naval officer of Tây Sơn dynasty.

Lun was put to death by slow slicing. To lodge the protest, his official seal was sent back to Vietnam.

== See also ==
- Pirates of the South China Coast
