= Battle of the Leotung =

1855 naval battle

- Part of Piracy in Asia
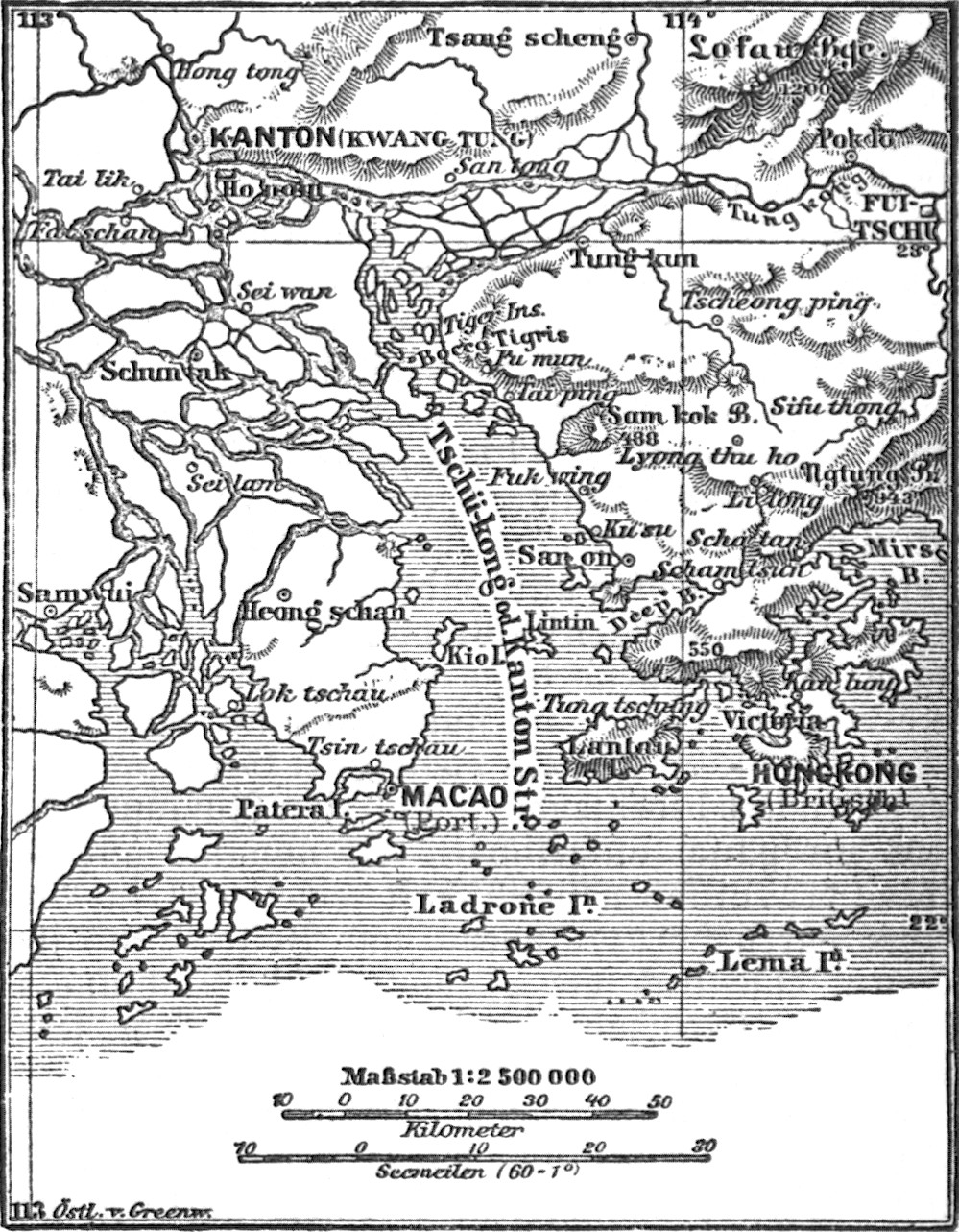
- An 1890 map of the Pearl River Delta, Leotung is at the center right.
Date	August 19, 1855
Location	Gulf of Leotung, China
Result	British victory

Belligerents
United Kingdom	Chinese Pirates

Commanders and leaders
(United Kingdom) Charles Turner (United Kingdom) Edward W. Vansittart	Unknown

Strength
1 brig 1 steamer	2 lorchas ~37 war-junks

Casualties and losses
None; 1 brig damaged 1 steamer damaged	~300 killed or wounded 2 lorchas sunk 6 war-junks sunk ~5 war-junks damaged

The Battle of the Leotung was a British victory against an overwhelming fleet of Chinese pirate ships. In 1855 the Royal Navy launched a series of operations into the Gulf of Leotung and surrounding area to suppress piracy, several battles were fought and hundreds of pirates were killed.

== Background ==
In the 1850s the southern China coast was base for many different pirate groups, Eli Boggs' being the most famous. Vessels used by the Chinese pirates were armed with guns ranging from thirty-two pounders and down and had complements on average of fifty or more. European and American sailors often were among the pirate crews. The war-junks engaged in the Leotung battle carried six to over eighteen guns each and all displaced ninety to 200 tons, with the exception of the lorchas which were larger and better armed. Several pirate fleets operated in the Pearl River Delta and it became the target of a British counter-piracy operation in mid to late 1855. One expedition of one brig and two chartered steamers was under the command of Captain Charles Turner. The brig was HMS Bittern carrying twelve guns and 125 officers, crew and marines, she was under Commander Edward W. Vansittart. The steamer Confucius was crewed by Chinese sailors and armed by guns from the frigate USS Macedonian but she did not engage in battle as she ran low on coal and was forced to leave the expedition not long after it began. The other steamer Pavushan or Paoushan was not armed but was commanded by Captain Turner and used to tow the Bittern through shallow water.

== Battle ==
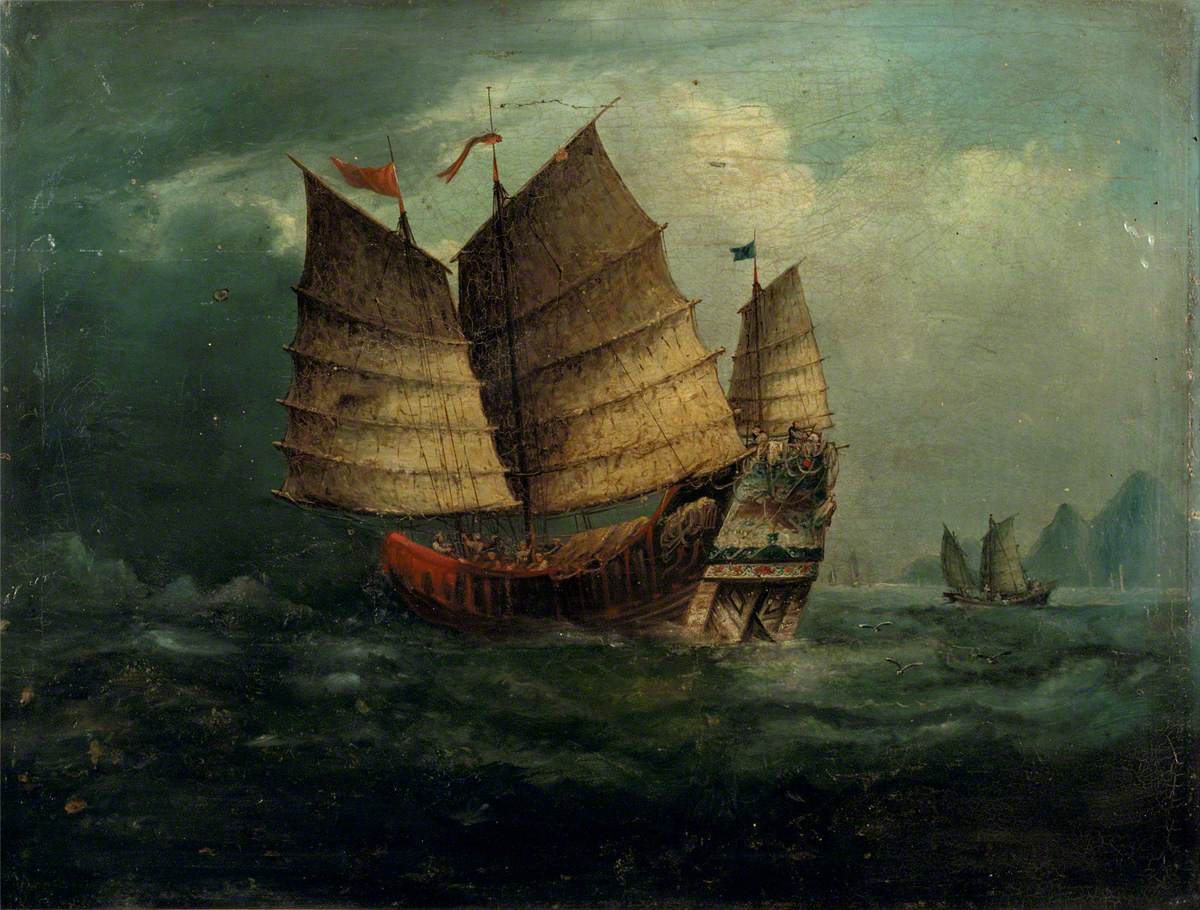
A painting of Chinese junks, circa 1850.

On August 18 while sailing in the Gulf of Leotung, the Pavushan and the Bittern came within sight of thirty-seven to forty junks, including two lorchas. They were positioned near the mouth of the river which led to Fuchan. Later Commander Vansittart reported that because of the heavy rain and thick mist he could not get an accurate count of the pirate ships he spotted. Bittern and Pavushan advanced until just over two miles away from the pirate fleet and anchored for the night. The following morning the pirates initiated the battle after they formed two divisions and began an advance towards the British ships. When within range the pirates opened up with their cannon and the British returned fire. The pirates' armament mostly included long 18-pounders which gave them a further range so for about ten minutes the two sides dueled but only the Chinese were capable making any hits. Bittern was the main target for Chinese fire and was struck a few times before achieving her first hit. Most of the pirates' fire reportedly passed over and through the sails and rigging of the Royal Navy vessels and when the pirates came within range of the Bittern her broadsides became more accurate and she raked several vessels and apparently damaged them severely. Due to this the pirates were forced to regroup and retreat. Attempting to trick the British into running aground; the pirates fled through a mess of reef and sandbars. The trick failed and the Bittern was able to maneuver through the treacherous waters and keep up her heavy fire. Both of the lorchas, the vessels said to have fired the most accurate shots, were sunk along with six other junks. The remaining thirty or so vessels escaped and towed at least five damaged junks away. An estimated 300 pirates became casualties and none were captured, some of the pirates were thought to be European. Bittern and Pavushan did not receive too much damage and none of the British service men were harmed in an action that lasted around an hour.

== Aftermath ==
The pirate fleet headed north for New Chang where they seized several merchant ships and threatened to kill hostages and attack the port if $100,000 was not paid to them. They killed one Chinese sailor and sent his body ashore in a basket so afterwards the Chinese officials gave in to the demands and the ransom was paid. Before freeing the merchantmen they forced the crews to pay them 1,200 dollars for each ship. Those who could not afford to pay were killed and their ships burned. The pirates then split into several smaller groups and hid themselves among the Pearl River's several streams and tributaries. On August 20, the morning after the battle, Bittern was under tow by Pavushan and headed north to begin freeing the dozens of captured merchantmen all over the region. In western Mid-Tao Strait they encountered thirteen of the pirate craft and after another battle, one was captured and turned over to the Chinese government and ten others were sunk by gun fire or first burned and then sunk. Bittern and Pavushan sunk another junk on August 30, north of Staunton Island, and later in September they fought the Battle of Sheipoo against Eli Boggs' fleet. Captain Charles Turner was killed in the battle and Commander Vansittart took command and finished the action with a decisive British victory. Vansittart later became a vice admiral in the Royal Navy.

== See also ==
- Golden Age of Piracy
