= HMS Hastings (1819) =

Ship of the line of the Royal Navy

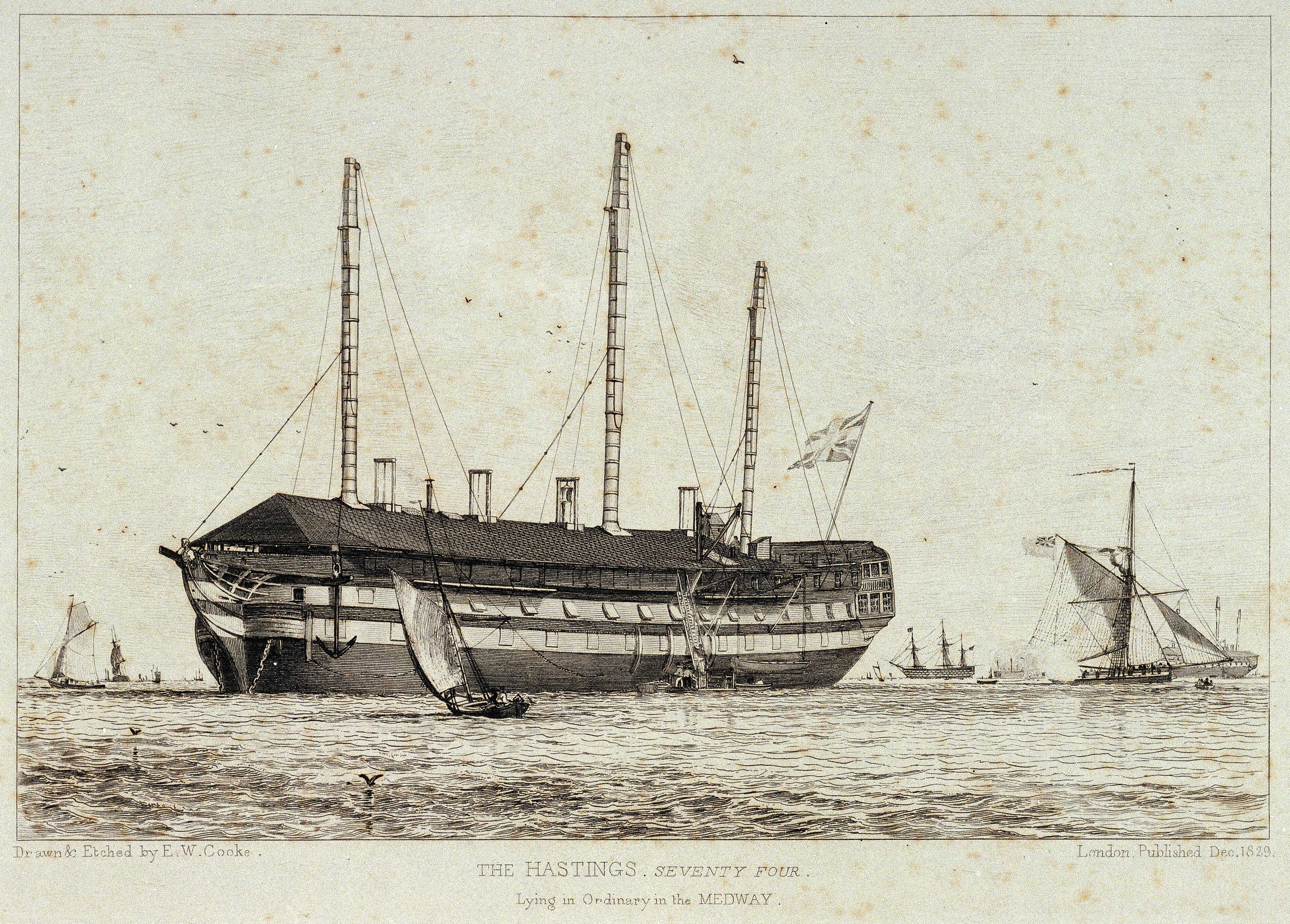
- The Hastings, lying in Ordinary in the Medway, December 1829

History

United Kingdom
- Name: Hastings
- Namesake: Warren Hastings
- Builder: Kyd & Co, Kidderpore
- Launched: 8 January 1818
- Fate: Sold to British Admiralty 1819

History

United Kingdom
- Name: HMS Hastings
- Acquired: 22 June 1819, from British East India Company
- Fate: Sold, 1886

General characteristics
- Class & type: 74-gun third rate ship of the line
- Tons burthen: 1732, or 1763 (bm)
- Length: 176 ft 10 1/2 in (53.9 m) (gundeck)
- Beam: 48 ft 6 in (14.8 m)
- Depth of hold: 21 ft (6.4 m)
- Propulsion: Sails
- Sail plan: Full-rigged ship
- Armament: Gundeck: 28 × 32-pounder guns; Upper gundeck: 28 × 18-pounder guns; QD: 4 × 12-pounder guns + 10 × 32-pounder carronades; Fc: 2 × 12-pounder guns + 2 × 32-pounder carronades

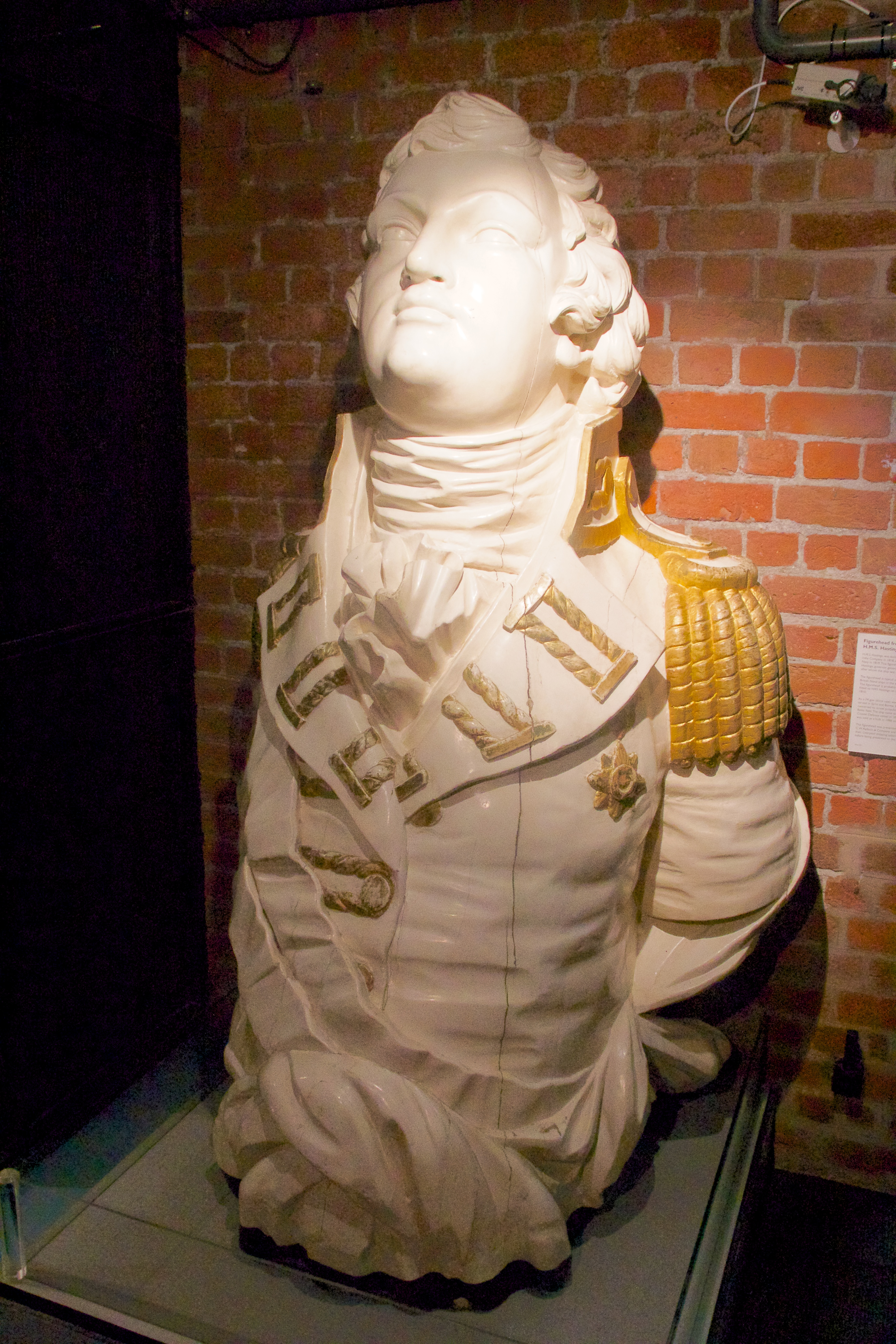
Figurehead from HMS Hastings (Note: The Ship's figurehead is now on display at the Merseyside Maritime Museum.)

HMS Hastings was a 74-gun third rate ship of the line of the Royal Navy. She was built in Calcutta for the Honourable East India Company, but the Royal Navy purchased her in 1819. The Navy sold her in 1886.

== East India Company ==
Hastings was built of the highest quality "saul", "sissoo", "Pegue", and "Java" teak wood, following Sir Robert Seppings's principles, which resulted in a vessel both longitudinal and transverse support. Her construction cost sicca rupees (Sa.Rs.) 8,71,406 (£108,938), which the merchants of Calcutta and other patriotic individuals subscribed via shares. The full cost of getting her ready for sea was Sa.Rs. 8,71,406 (£116,375).

Captain John Hayes sailed Hastings from Calcutta on 28 March 1818. She reached Madras on 13 April, and Port Louis on 2 July. From there she reached St Helena on 15 September, and arrived at The Downs on 3 November.

== HMS Hastings ==
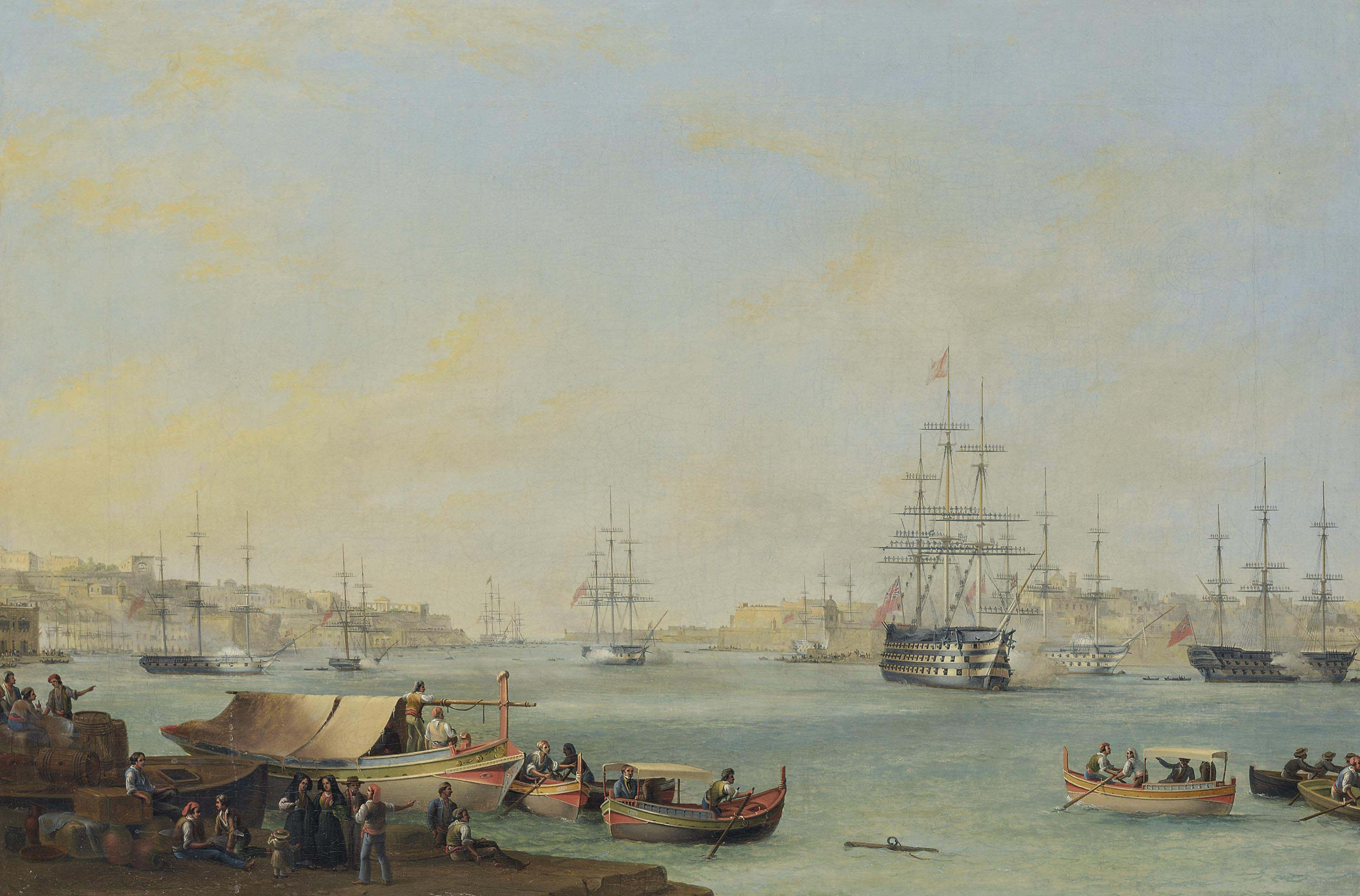
The arrival of the Dowager Queen Adelaide aboard HMS Hastings at the Grand Harbour, Valletta, 1838, painted by Anton Schranz

The Admiralty purchased Hastings on 22 June 1819. It paid about half of what the vessel had cost the shareholders in Calcutta that had subscribed to her construction. The belief in Calcutta was that the jealousy of the Thames shipbuilders led to the undervaluation of the ship.

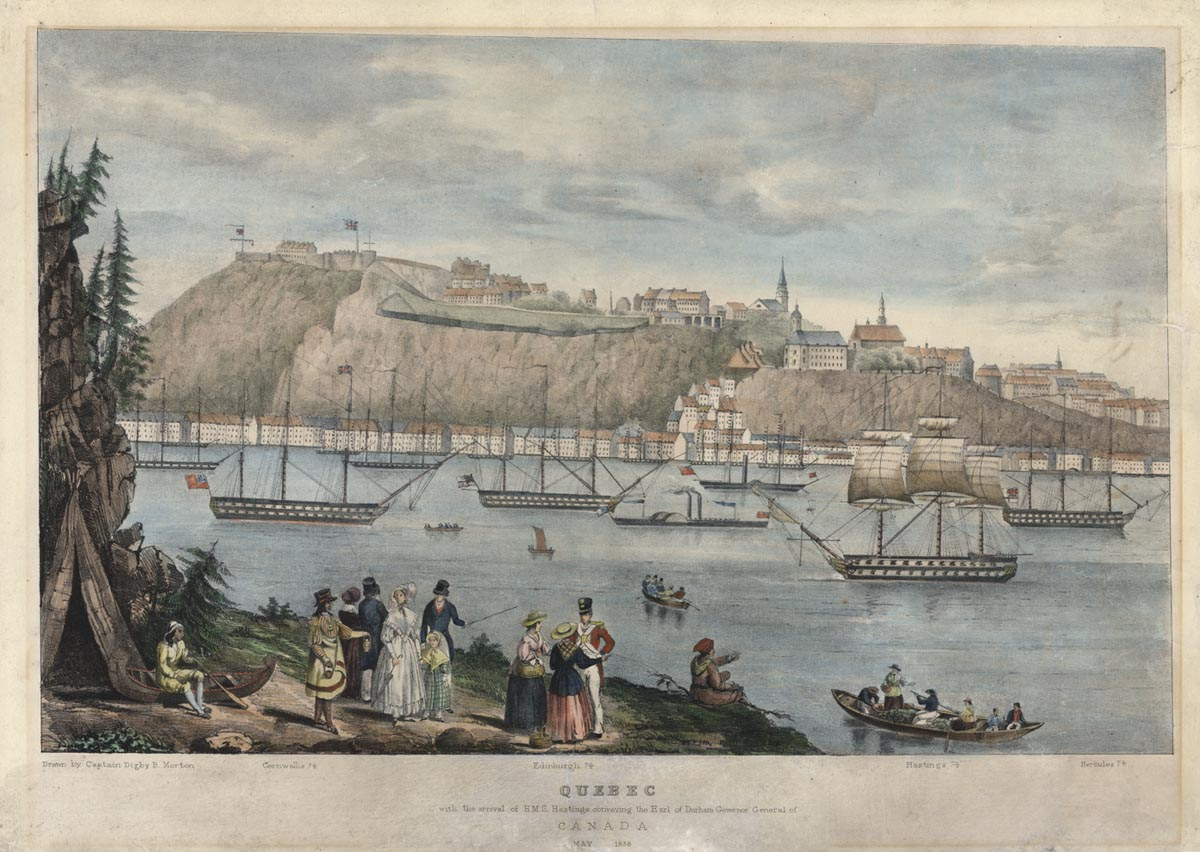
Quebec, with the arrival of HMS Hastings conveying the Earl Of Durnham Governor General of Canada, May 1838, by Capt. Digby B. Morton

In 1838 the ship took the new governor, Lord John Lambton, 1st Earl of Durham, to Canada. The ship arrived in Quebec on 27 May 1838.

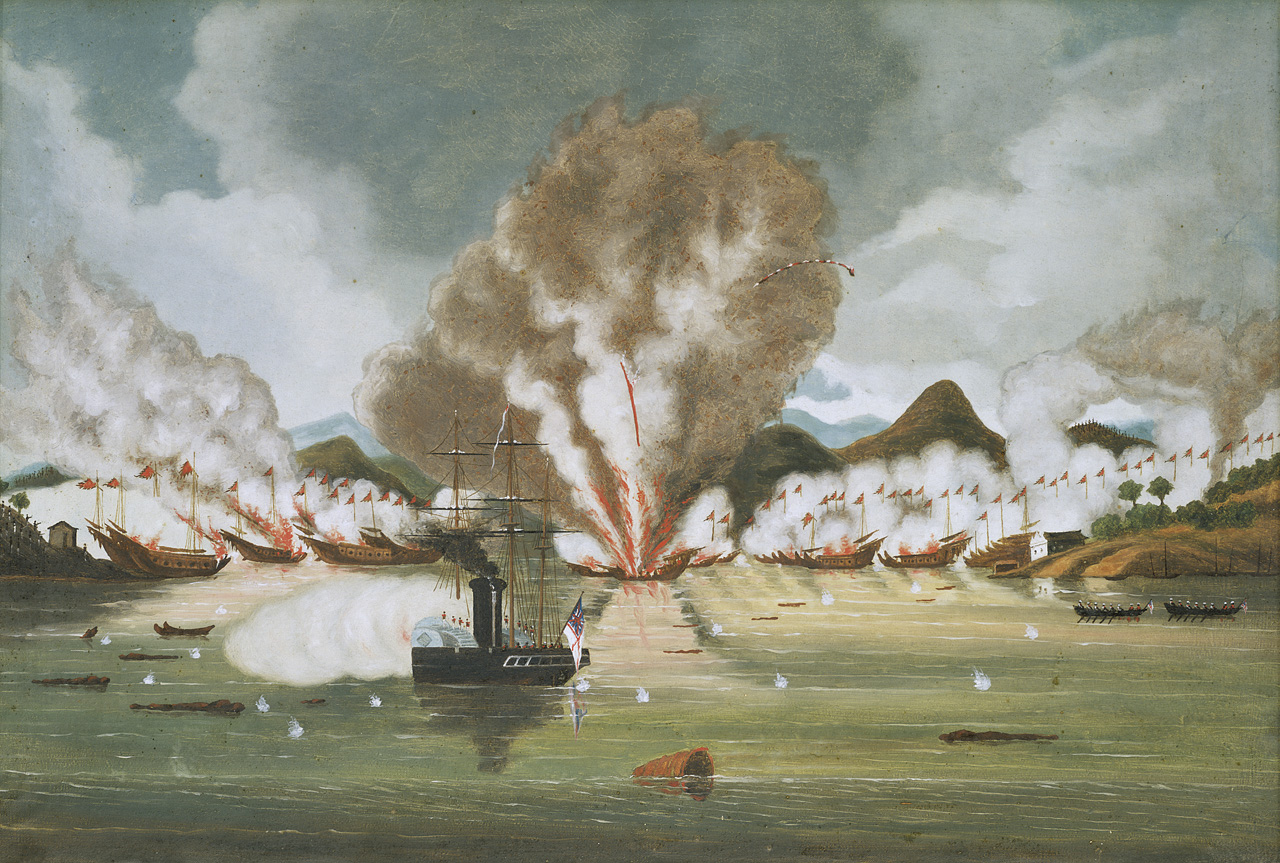
Destruction of Chui A-poo's Pirate Fleet, 30 September 1849

Sailors and marines from Hastings fought Chinese pirates at the Battle of Tonkin River in 20–22 October 1849.

In 1855 she was fitted with screw propulsion. In 1857 the ship was deployed to Liverpool on coastal defence duties before being transferred to the Royal Naval Reserve to be used as a training ship.

== Fate ==
Hastings was sold out of the navy in 1886 .
