= Zheng Yi Sao =

Chinese pirate (1775–1844)

- 鄭一嫂
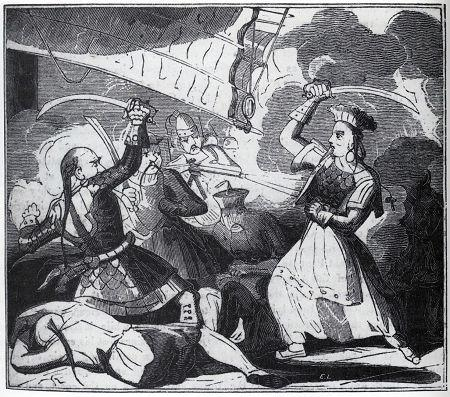
- Zheng Yi Sao in an 1836 illustration
- Born: Shi Yang (石陽) c. 1775; Xinhui County, Guangdong, Qing China
- Died: 1844 (aged 68–69); Nanhai, Guangdong, Qing China
- Occupations: Pirate leader and gambling house owner
- Criminal charge: Piracy
- Criminal status: Pacified
- Spouses: Zheng Yi (m. 1801; died 1807); Zheng Bao (m. 1810; died 1822)
- Children: Zheng Yingshi (鄭英石) (son); Zheng Xiongshi (鄭雄石) (son); Zhang Yulin (張玉麟) (son); name unknown (daughter)
- Piratical career
- Other names: Shi Xianggu (石香姑); Ching Shih (鄭氏)
- Type: Pirate
- Allegiance: Guangdong Pirate Confederation (1805–1810)
- Years active: 1801–1810
- Base of operations: Lantau Island, Hong Kong
- Commands: Guangdong Pirate Confederation (400 ships, 40,000–70,000 pirates in 1805) Personal command of 24 ships and 1,433 pirates in 1810
- Later work: Gambling house owner at Guangzhou

Zheng Yi Sao

Ching Shih
- Traditional Chinese: 鄭氏
- Simplified Chinese: 郑氏
- Literal meaning: wife of Zheng
Transcriptions
Standard Mandarin
- Hanyu Pinyin: Zhèng Shì
Yue: Cantonese
- Jyutping: zeng^{6} si^{6}

Cheng I Sao
- Traditional Chinese: 鄭一嫂
- Simplified Chinese: 郑一嫂
- Literal meaning: wife of Zheng Yi
Transcriptions
Standard Mandarin
- Hanyu Pinyin: Zhèng Yī Sǎo
Yue: Cantonese
- Jyutping: zeng^{6} jat^{1} sou^{2}

Shih Yang; (birth name)
- Traditional Chinese: 石陽
- Simplified Chinese: 石阳
Transcriptions
Standard Mandarin
- Hanyu Pinyin: Shí Yáng
Yue: Cantonese
- Jyutping: sek^{6} joeng^{4}

Shih Heang Koo; (former nickname)
- Chinese: 石香姑
Transcriptions
Standard Mandarin
- Hanyu Pinyin: Shí Xiāng Gū
Yue: Cantonese
- Jyutping: sek^{6} hoeng^{1} gu^{1}

Shi Yang (c. 1775–1844) also known as Zheng Yi , Shi Xianggu, Shek Yeung, Quing Shi, and Ching Shih, was a Chinese pirate leader active in the South China Sea from 1801 to 1810.

Born Shi Yang in 1775, she married the pirate Zheng Yi at age 26 in 1801. She became known as Zheng Yi Sao ("wife of Zheng Yi") among the Cantonese. After the death of her husband in 1807, she took control of his pirate confederation with the support of Zheng Yi's adopted son Zhang Bao. She later entered into a relationship with Zhang Bao and eventually married him. While still under Zheng Yi's command in 1805, the fleet consisted of approximately 400 junks and between 40,000 and 70,000 pirates. Her ships primarily attacked Chinese warships and merchant shipping and occasionally targeted European vessels.

After suffering a string of defeats at the hands of the Portuguese Navy, in 1810, Zheng Yi Sao negotiated a surrender to Qing authorities that allowed her and Zhang Bao to retain 24 ships and over 1,400 pirates and to avoid prosecution. She died in 1844 at the age of about 68, having lived a relatively peaceful and prosperous life after her career in piracy. Zheng Yi Sao has been described as history's most successful female pirate and among the most successful pirates overall.

== Early life ==
Zheng Yi Sao was born in 1775 near Xinhui, Guangdong. She may have been a Tanka, and is sometimes described as having worked on a floating Tanka brothel (花船; huā chuán) in Guangdong, possibly as a prostitute or procurer, although evidence for this claim is lacking.

== Marriage to Zheng Yi ==
In 1801, Shi Yang married Zheng Yi, a pirate. Zheng Yi fought as a privateer for the Vietnamese Tây Sơn dynasty in the Tây Sơn wars and later Nguyễn Ánh (Gia Long), first emperor of the Nguyễn dynasty. Under Tây Sơn patronage, he fought in his cousin Zheng Qi's fleet. Zheng Yi hailed from a family of pirates whose roots traced back to the Ming dynasty. He had an adopted son, Zhang Bao, whom he had abducted in 1798 at age 15 and pressed into piracy.

A year after Shi and Zheng's marriage, in February 1802, Zheng Yi's cousin Zheng Qi was captured and executed by Nguyễn regime forces in the town of Jiangping (江平) on the border of Vietnam and China, near what is now Dongxing. On July 20, 1802, Nguyễn Ánh entered the city of Thăng Long, ending the Tây Sơn dynasty. Zheng Yi took over Zheng Qi's fleet after his death and sailed back to the Chinese coast with the pirates formerly under Tây Sơn patronage.

Following a period of infighting among pirates near Guangdong, Zheng Yi, with the capable support of Zheng Yi Sao, united the pirates into a confederation through an agreement signed in July 1805. Each pirate leader agreed to sacrifice some of his autonomy for the greater good. The confederation consisted of six fleets, distinguished by the color of their flags – red, black, blue, white, yellow, and purple. Zheng Yi commanded the largest, the 200-Ship Red Flag Fleet.

Zheng Yi Sao had two sons with Zheng Yi: Zheng Yingshi (鄭英石), born in 1803, and Zheng Xiongshi (鄭雄石), born in 1807.

== Ascension to leadership ==
On 16 November 1807, Zheng Yi fell overboard in a gale and died at the age of 42. Zheng Yi Sao took over her deceased husband's operations, through the support of Zheng Yi's nephew Zheng Baoyang (鄭保養) and the son of Zheng Qi, Zheng Anbang (鄭安邦). Zheng Yi Sao balanced the various factions in the confederation, and was familiar with Guo Podai (郭婆帶), leader of the second biggest fleet in the confederation, the Black Flag Fleet, who had been abducted by Zheng Yi and pressed into piracy at a young age. Most importantly, Zheng Yi Sao had the support of Zhang Bao, who was in effect commanding the Red Flag Fleet at the time.

Zheng Yi Sao effectively inherited her deceased husband's informal command over the entire Pirate Confederation, while Zhang Bao became the official commander of the Red Flag Fleet. According to a report by Wen Chengzhi (溫承誌), a government official who led the negotiations with Zheng Yi Sao and Zhang Bao with the Viceroy of Liangguang Bai Ling (百齡) later in 1810, "Zhang Bao obeyed Zheng Yi Sao's orders, and consulted her on all things before acting (張保...仍聽命於鄭一之妻石氏，事必請而後行)." Taking the local monks under his protection, Zhang Bao, asserted himself as the leader of a sect to which the pirates adhered. Zhang Bao was even rumoured at Macau to aspire to becoming Emperor of China.

After taking control of the confederation, Zheng Yi Sao and Zhang Bao entered a sexual relationship. It is speculated that they were already intimate before the death of Zheng Yi.

== Leader of the confederation ==
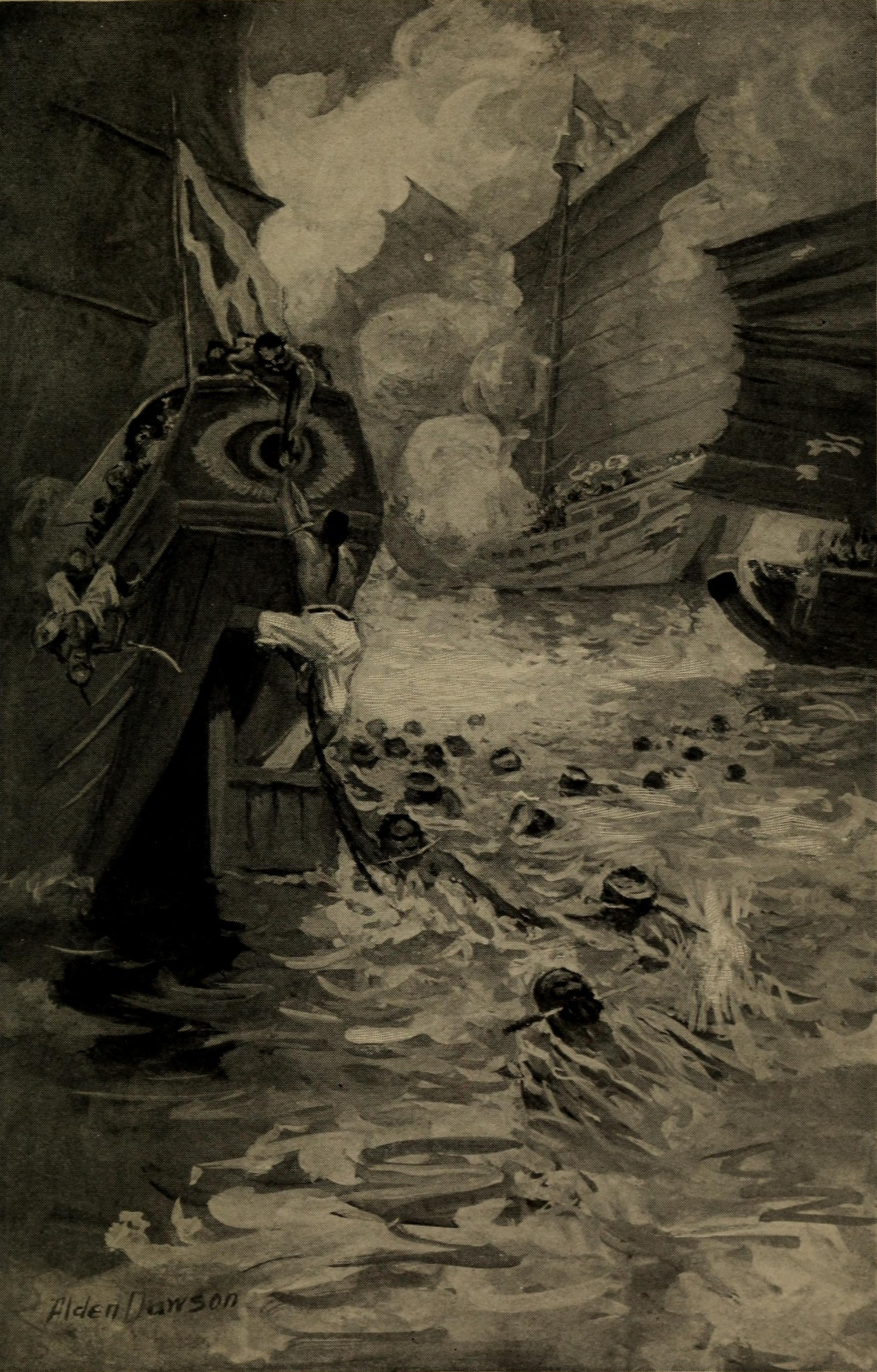
Cheung Po Tsai's pirates fighting the Chinese ships at the battle off Ladrone Islands c. 1808.

In 1808, a year after Zheng Yi Sao took power, the Pirate Confederation became significantly more active. In September, Zhang Bao first lured then ambushed Lin Guoliang (林國良), brigade-general (統兵) of Humen, and destroyed his fleet of 35 ships near Mazhou Island, located east of what is now Bao'an District, Shenzhen. A month later in October, Zhang Bao defeated lieutenant-colonel (參將) Lin Fa (林發) near present-day Weiyuan Island east of Humen Town. These two engagements reduced the Chinese provincial fleet by half, and cleared the way for the pirates to enter the Pearl River.

1809 was an eventful year for the Pirate Confederation under the command of Zheng Yi Sao. In March, Provincial Commander (提督) Sun Quanmou (孫全謀), with around 100 ships under his command, engaged a small group of pirates near Dawanshan Island, and the pirates called Zheng Yi Sao for aid. Before the battle, Zheng Yi Sao took command of the Red Flag Fleet and the White Flag Fleet and ordered Zhang Bao to engage from the front with around 10 ships. Zhang Bao's lieutenants, Xiang Shan'er (香山二) and Xiao Bu'ao (蕭步鰲) were to outflank Sun from the sides, and Liang Bao (梁保), leader of the White Flag Fleet, was to cut Sun off from the rear. During the battle Zheng Yi Sao charged in with the bulk of the Red and the White Flag Fleets, which routed Sun.

On July 21, the Qing navy dealt a major blow to the Pirate Confederation by killing Liang Bao and destroying his White Flag Fleet at an engagement near what is now Jinwan District, Zhuhai, at the cost of losing brigade-general Xu Tinggui (許廷桂) and 25 ships to Zhang Bao.

Liang's death and the destruction of the White Flag Fleet did not deter Zheng Yi Sao. In August 1809 she ordered a massive raid: Zhang Bao would raid around Dongguan with the Red Flag Fleet, Guo Podai would raid around Shunde with the Black Flag Fleet, and Zheng Yi Sao would lead the raid around Xinhui with her personal fleet. Guo Podai worked his way through the numerous waterways along the Pearl River for six weeks on a bloody raiding campaign which ultimately caused the deaths of approximately 10,000 people. In early September, Zhang Bao completely destroyed a large town not far from Humen and killed 2,000 inhabitants. Numerous villages, settlements, and towns fell victim to the rampaging pirates.

On September 27, Zheng Yi Sao personally took command of 500 ships and anchored near Tanzhou (潭洲). On the 29th, Zheng Yi Sao ordered Zhang Bao to raid the town of Shating (沙亭) further upriver, where he captured around 400 civilians; on October 2, Zheng Yi Sao ordered Guo Podai to anchor around Jigongshi (雞公石), presumably near Sanxiongqi (三雄奇, modern day Sanhongqi 三洪奇), where he raided two days later.

By late October, the provincial fleet was back to strength and ready for action under the command of Sun Quanmou; however, they were defeated again by Zhang Bao on the evening of October 21 near the town of Shawan.

=== Cornered by the Portuguese Navy ===
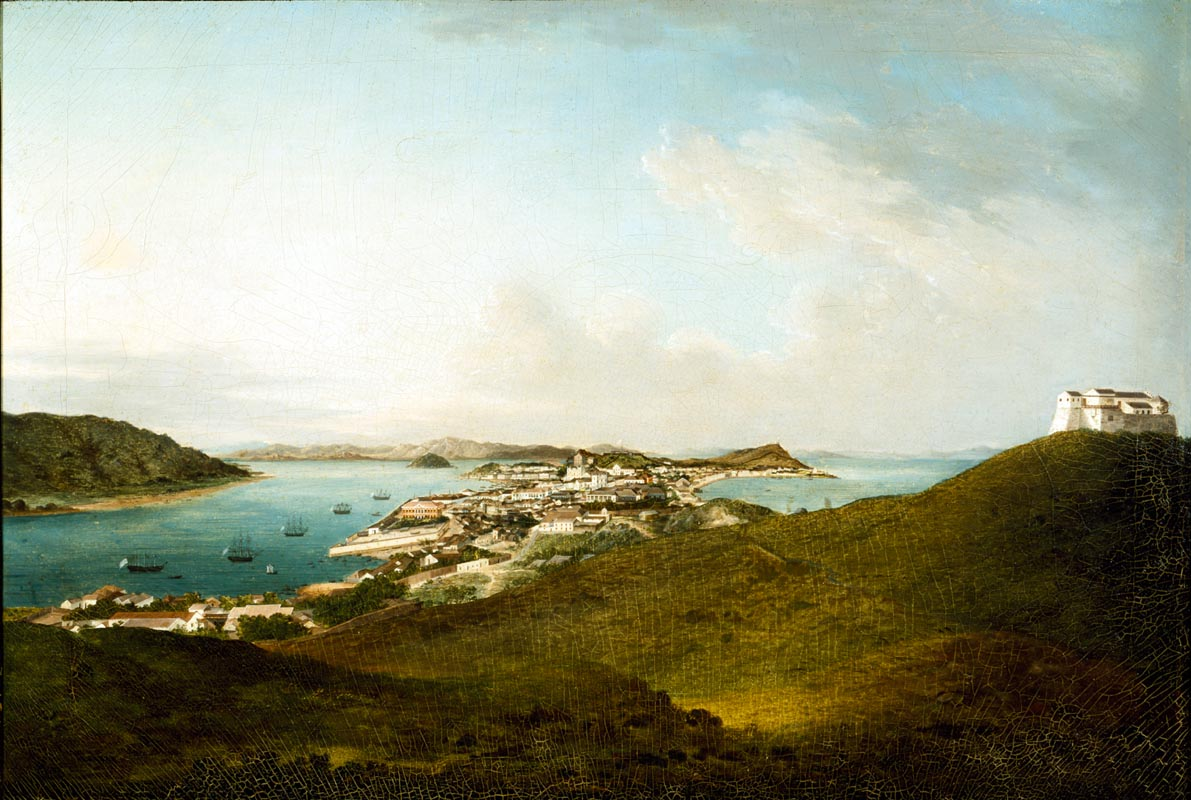
Macau in 1830.

In desperation, Chinese officials looked with renewed interest at the "foreign barbarians", hoping to obtain aid against Zheng Yi Sao and the Pirate Confederation. The mandarin of Qianshan had requested Portuguese military assistance at Macau as early as 1791. The Portuguese Empire, which controlled Macau at the time, had already fought the pirates. They had attacked a Portuguese ship near Macau in 1793, in which they killed all but four crewmembers, and in 1796, in which they again killed everyone on board. In 1804 they occupied the Taipa anchorage, threatening the city, and later that year disrupted communications between Macau and Lantau, which caused difficulties in supplying foreign ships anchored by the island. In the middle of 1807, a pirate squadron had attacked a Portuguese brig commanded by captain Pereira Barreto, yet Barreto not only repulsed the pirates but he also captured their flagship in a boarding action with 70 men. The Portuguese agreed to help as Zheng Yi Sao had captured a brig belonging to the Portuguese governor of Timor António Botelho Homem on September 5, 1809, and they were eager for payback.

In early September, the brigs Princesa Carlota and Belisário along with the supply lorcha Leão left Macau under the command of captain José Pinto Alcoforado de Azevedo e Sousa and he engaged the pirate fleet, who focused on the weaker lorcha but were repulsed by the modern armaments of the Portuguese, which included rifles and modern rifled cannon that fired explosive shells. A typhoon overcame the region and while it raged the Portuguese prisoners aboard the captured brig managed to break free, and escape from the Red Flag Fleet with their ship to Taipa amid the storm. On September 15, the British East India Company (EIC) agreed to help the Qing against the pirates with the frigate Mercury, then anchored at Macau. That same day, the Portuguese set out to meet the pirate fleet once again, but the Mercury remained in harbour and took no further action against the pirates. The Portuguese fleet engaged 200 ships commanded by Zheng Bao, sighted at anchor at a place the Portuguese identified as Wam-pao channels. The pirates sailed out to meet the Portuguese fleet and they were severely damaged by artillery, but by sunset both fleets disengaged, with one of the Portuguese brigs seriously damaged by the pirates fire and the other by the recoil of its own artillery.

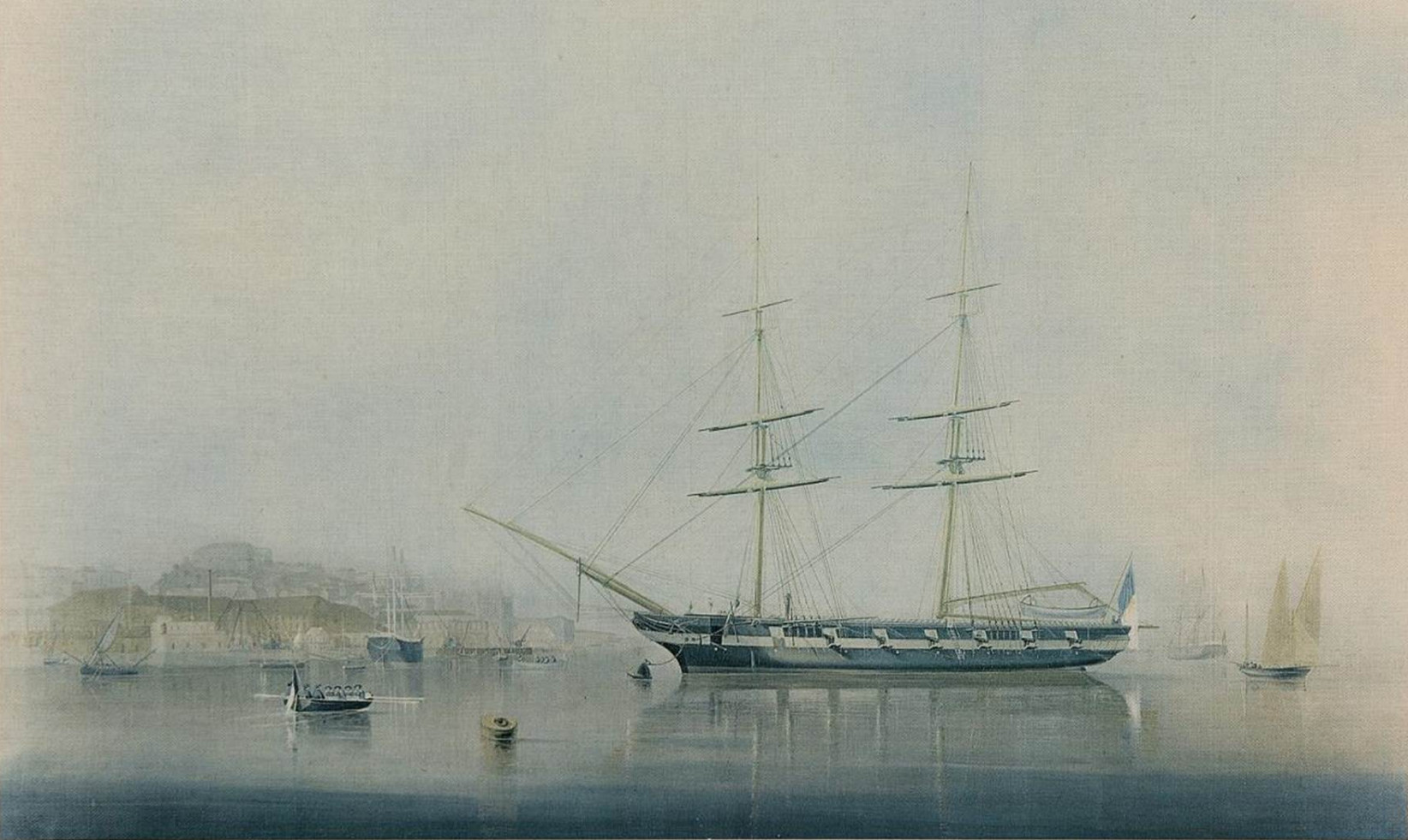
19th century Portuguese brig.

In early November, 1809, Zheng Yi Sao suddenly left the Pearl River with only a few ships, and anchored at Tung Chung Bay, north of Lantau Island, for repairs. On November 4, the Portuguese sent three ships and a brig to harass Zheng Yi Sao at Lantau. She immediately called the Red Flag Fleet under Zhang Bao for aid. On the 5th, Zhang Bao arrived at Tung Chung Bay and, seeing that the Portuguese were no longer there, decided to anchor his ships for repair and maintenance.

The prestigious ouvidor (chief-magistrate) of Macau Miguel José de Arriaga convinced the viceroy of Guangzhou not to accept any further help from the English, and instead cooperate with Portugal against the pirates. The viceroy dispatched emissaries to Macau to negotiate a joint operation. Portuguese authorities agreed to supply 6 ships, while the Qing would provide a fleet for the duration of six months, a sum of 80,000 taels to pay for the outfitting of Portuguese ships, and to restore former privileges of Macau (none of which they would fulfill). The agreement was laid out in a document with seven articles, signed on November 23 by the Portuguese magistrates Miguel José de Arriaga, José Joaquim de Barros, and the Chinese plenipotenciaries Shing-Kei-Chi, Chu and Pom. On November 29, a new Portuguese flotilla with the frigate Inconquistável, the brigs Indiana, Belisário, Conceição, São Miguel and Princesa Carlota set out from Macau to link up with the Qing fleet, but the pirates moved to intercept them and two fleets clashed until the pirates retreated at the end of nine hours of combat. They regrouped and counter-attacked, but were repulsed once again. As the Qing fleet was not forthcoming, the Portuguese returned to Macau.

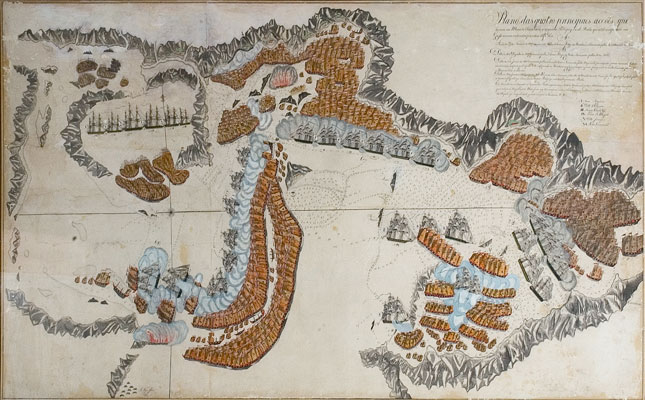
A Portuguese illustration of naval combat between the Portuguese Navy and Chinese pirates at the Pearl River Delta in 1809-1810.

Zheng Bao decided to risk a decisive engagement and on 11 December 1809 he moved all of his ships close to Macau divided in three groups but the Portuguese forced the pirates to withdraw. After this battle, the Senate of Macau had Alcoforado deliver a letter to Zhang Bao threatening to pursue hostilities until his demise if he didn't negotiate a surrender to the Qing, but he refused. Instead he replied with a letter proposing a separate peace with the Portuguese. Portuguese authorities however, refused to break with the Qing. On 26 December 1809, Zhang Bao wrote another letter declaring that he aspired to the Imperial throne and offered the Portuguese two provinces of China in exchange for four ships. This too was refused. The Black Flag Fleet then defected to the Chinese authorities, under an offer of redemption.

Zhang Bao tried a new tactic and sent out a small group of smaller and faster ships to distract the squadron of Alcoforado. The bulk of the fleet was then shifted to narrow channels were they could not be reached by the heavier Portuguese ships. Zhang Bao also forced captive American and British sailors to teach his crew how to properly use cannon. Local British merchants secretly supplied the pirates with weapons and ammunition in the hopes that the Portuguese would be defeated so that Chinese authorities would have to turn to them.

Alcoforado caused further losses on the pirates on January 3 and 4. On the 21 of that month the Portuguese flotilla anchored by Lantau Island and Zheng Bao mobilized his entire fleet of over 300 ships, 1500 guns and 20,000 men in a last-ditch attempt to defeat them, but the pirates struggled to maneuvre and their compact mass of ships presented an ideal target to Portuguese gunners. After the pirates had lost a great pagoda-ship at the center of their formation, they lost heart and retreated into a shallow river or bay where their ships couldn't enter due to their larger draught, variously identified as Hiang-San or Lintim. Alcoforado had his ships positioned in a line across the bay, and the pirate fleet was finally cornered. On the 20th, 93 ships from the provincial fleet joined the Portuguese in their blockade, commanded by Sun Quanmou.

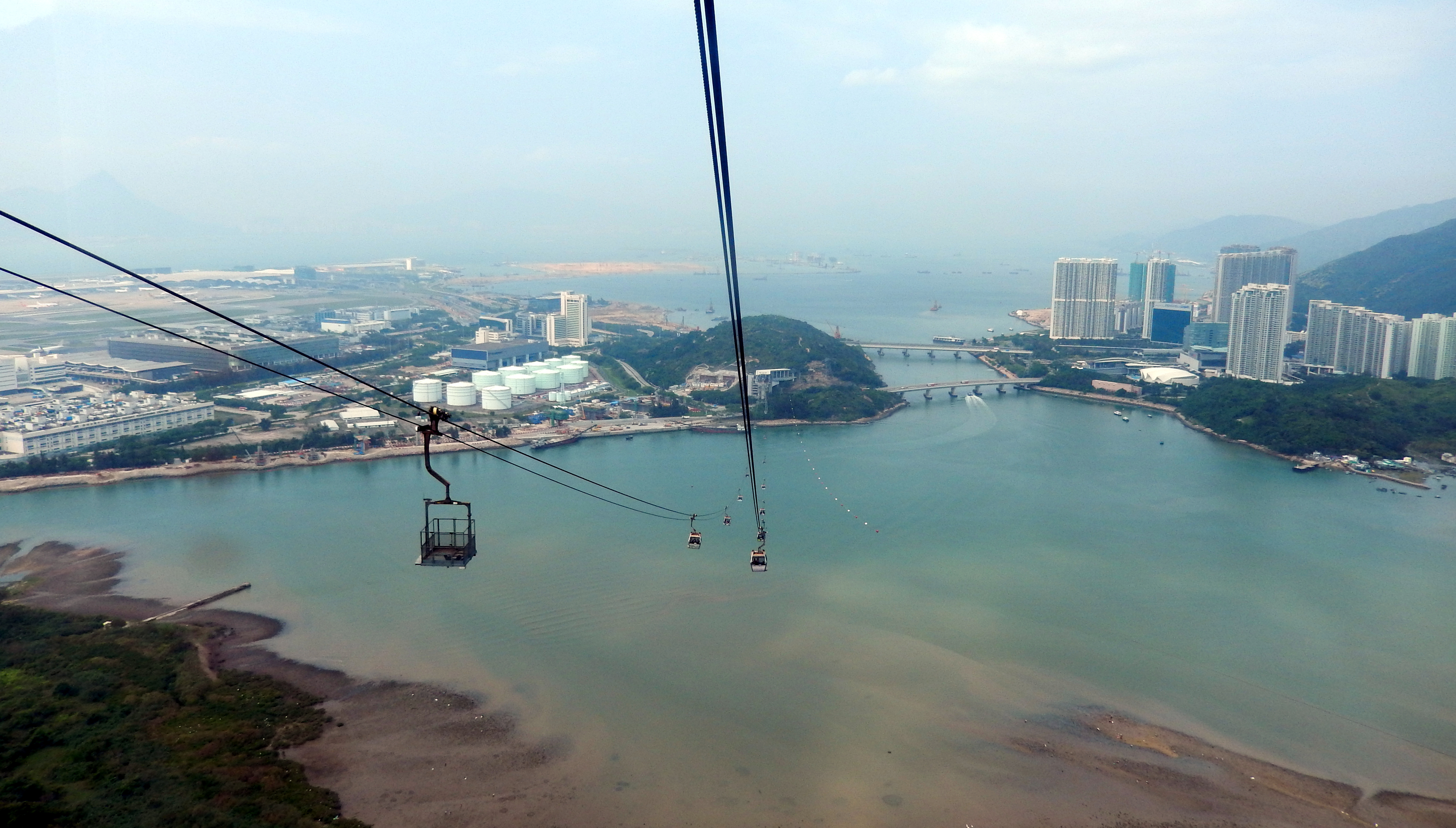
Tung Chung Bay in 2014

The pirates made various attempts to counterattack and break the blockade, but were unsuccessful due to unfavorable winds. On the 23rd, the pirates managed to capture one ship from the provincial fleet, and killed the 74 men aboard. The situation turned into a stalemate between the pirates and the joint Sino-Portuguese fleet. Frustrated with the lack of progress, Sun Quanmou converted 43 of his ships into fireships and set them adrift towards the pirates in Tung Chung Bay on the 28th.

The pirates diverted the fireships, towed them ashore, extinguished the fires, and broke them up for firewood. At this point the wind changed, and two of the fireships were blown back to the provincial fleet and ignited two of Sun's own ships. On the 29th, Zhang Bao and Zheng Yi Sao, taking full advantage of the wind, broke through the blockade, and escaped into the South China Sea. The provincial fleet lost 3 ships and at least 74 men, while the pirates lost 40 men and no ships.

=== Surrendering to the Qing authorities ===
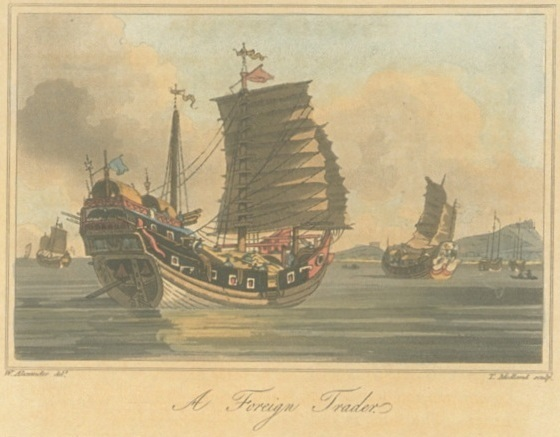
A Chinese junk depicted in Travels in China: containing descriptions, observations, and comparisons, made and collected in the course of a short residence at the imperial palace of Yuen-Min-Yuen, and on a subsequent journey through the country from Pekin to Canton, published in 1804

The year 1810 saw the end of the Pirate Confederation. Sources differ on the motivation as to why the pirates surrendered.

By early 1810, the pirates began to realize that they were in such a position of power that they could negotiate to surrender to the Guangdong government without punishment or reparations being imposed on them. Guangdong was so desperate to end the scourge of piracy that they were ready to legitimize their power in exchange for their retirement.

An alternative viewpoint is that by the end of 1809 the tides were turning against Zheng Yi Sao and the Pirate Confederation. Guo Podai, leader of the Black Flag Fleet, refused to reinforce Zheng Yi Sao and Zhang Bao during the Battle of Tung Chung Bay, and later openly battled with Zhang Bao near Humen. The Portuguese and EIC officially joined in the fray. On November 23, the Portuguese signed an agreement with Bai Ling, that called for six Portuguese ships to join the Chinese provincial fleet on patrol between Humen and Macau for six months. On January 13, 1810, Guo Podai officially surrendered to the Viceroy of Liangguang, Bai Ling, and was rewarded with the rank of sublieutenant (把總).

Bai Ling's policy of militia training and embargoes enjoyed reasonable success in cutting off the pirates' supply lines. It was all these reasons combined, plus the organizational limit of the Pirate Confederation, which was held together by a few charismatic leaders such as Zheng Yi Sao, Zhang Bao, and Guo Podai, that led Zheng Yi Sao to consider surrendering to the authorities in early 1810. Nevertheless, Zhang Bao demanded that the Portuguese magistrate at Macau Miguel José de Arriaga mediate the process, and refused to deal with Qing authorities unless he was present. Once Alcoforado received Zhang Baos demand, he delivered it to the Portuguese authorities in Macau and they then forwarded them to the Qing.

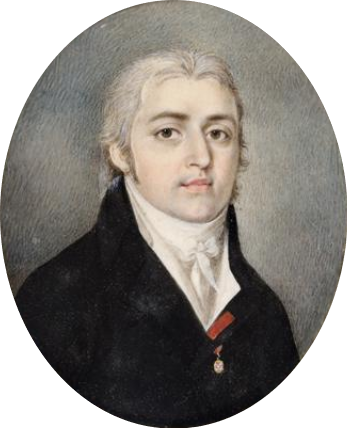
Ouvidor of Macau Miguel José de Arriaga Brum da Silveira.

With Macau's Ouvidor (magistrate) Miguel José de Arriaga as mediator, Zheng Yi Sao, Zhang Bao, and Bai Ling officially met on Zhang Bao's flagship on February 21, 1810. The negotiations quickly broke down when Bai Ling refused Zheng Yi Sao and Zhang Bao's demand of retaining 5,000 subordinates and 80 ships for entering the salt trade and joining the anti-pirate campaign in western Guangdong. At the end of the day, ten EIC East Indiamen sailed past the pirate fleet and alarmed Zhang Bao, who suspected some sort of Sino-European trap and quickly retreated.

Meanwhile, the governor of Macau Lucas José de Alvarenga refused to host the pirate fleet or the signing of their surrender in the city, hence Arriaga and Qing emissaries continued talks at Kun Iam Temple. They later met with Imperial delegates at Qianshan and they decided to have Zhang Bao surrender his fleet close by.

On April 17, Zheng Yi Sao, wanting to break the deadlock, personally led a delegation of 17 women and children to the Yamen at Guangzhou and negotiated with Bai Ling, where he yielded to her demands. On April 20, 1810, Zheng Yi Sao and Zhang Bao officially surrendered to Bai Ling near Furongsha (芙蓉沙, near what is now Guzaiwan 古仔湾) with 17,318 pirates, 226 ships, 1,315 cannons, and 2,798 assorted weapons. Zheng Yi Sao surrendered with 24 ships and 1,433 pirates under her personal command. At the meeting with Qing authorities, Zhang Bao sat near Arriaga and demanded to be treated as a free man by the Qing since he had only been defeated by the Portuguese. Zhang Bao was awarded the rank of lieutenant (千總), and was allowed to retain a private fleet of 20 to 30 ships. Zheng Yi Sao was also given permission to officially marry Zhang Bao. Zheng Yi Sao and her crews were pardoned, and the men received pork, wine and money. Nevertheless, 14 of the worst pirates were beheaded and their heads displayed on pikes between Macau and Qianshan, while 126 more were executed, 151 banished for life and 60 exiled for two years.

== Life after piracy and death ==
Along with the amnesty she was granted, Zheng Yi Sao was also given land in Canton where she owned and operated a very successful gambling house.

After surrendering, Zhang Bao further distinguished himself by defeating the Blue Flag Fleet under Wu Shi'er (烏石二) near the Leizhou Peninsula. Zhang Bao, with Zheng Yi Sao accompanying him, was later transferred to Min'an, Fujian, where Zheng Yi Sao gave birth to a son, Zhang Yulin, in 1813 (張玉麟). At some point, Zheng Yi Sao also gave birth to a daughter, however the time and name are unknown.

In 1822, Zhang Bao, aged 39, died near Penghu while serving as a colonel (副將) in charge of the Penghu garrison. In 1824, Zheng Yi Sao returned to Guangdong with Zhang Yulin. In 1840, while living at Nanhai, Zheng Yi Sao filed charges against a government official, Wu Yaonan (伍耀南), for having embezzled 28,000 taels of silver that Zhang Bao had handed over to him in 1810 for the purchase of an estate. The Viceroy of Liangguang at the time, Lin Zexu, petitioned the emperor to dismiss the case, which he did.

In 1844, Zheng Yi Sao died at the age of 68 or 69, having led a relatively peaceful life after the death of her second husband, as the proprietor of an infamous gambling house somewhere around Guangdong.

== Legacy ==
Zhang Bao's three codes for the pirates of the Red Flag Fleet are often misattributed to Zheng Yi Sao. The codes are:

1. If any pirate goes privately on shore, he shall be taken, his ears mutilated, he will be paraded around the fleet and executed.
2. Not the least thing shall be taken privately from the stolen and plundered goods, all shall be registered. The pirate receives for himself, out of ten parts, only two; eight parts belong to the storehouse, called the general fund; those who steal anything out of this general fund, shall be executed.
3. Women captured from villages shall not be harmed or harassed. All women captives shall be registered, their place of origin recorded, and be given separate quarters. Those who rape or commit adultery with the women captives shall be executed.

The three codes and the fact that Zhang Bao was the author of the codes were recorded in Jing hai fen ji (靖海氛記), an account of the Pirate Confederation by Qing official Yuan Yonglun (袁永綸) based on first-hand testimonies. The misattribution of the codes to Zheng Yi Sao most likely originated from Philip Gosse's The History of Piracy, first published in 1932, in which he said Zheng Yi Sao had drawn up "a code of rules for her crews which somewhat resembled those subscribed to by earlier European pirates."

Gosse claimed to have based the story of Zheng Yi Sao on a translation of Jing hai fen ji by Charles F. Neumann, in History of the Pirates Who Infested the China Sea from 1807 to 1810, published in 1831, which in itself contains numerous translation errors. It is thought that Gosse was primarily interested in a sensationalized account of Zheng Yi Sao, as he claimed in The History of Piracy that "the original (Jing hai fen ji), published in Canton in 1830, is chiefly devoted to the exploits of one pirate, and that a woman," while in fact Jin hai fen ji contains significantly more mentions of Zhang Bao (88) than Zheng Yi Sao (25).

Although the fact that the codes were misattributed was established, other sources list additional codes that may have been issued by Zheng Yi Sao, which are compiled below:

- Anyone caught giving commands on their own or disobeying a command from a superior is to be immediately decapitated.
- Pilfering from common treasury or public fund, and stealing from villagers who supplied the pirates were capital offences.
- No pirate could retain any good before inspection.
- Goods had to be registered and then distributed by the fleet leader.
- 20% of the booty was to be returned to the original captor and the remainder was placed in a joint treasury or storehouse.
- Currency was to be handed over to the squadron leader, part was turned over to the fleet, and some back to the captor.

A semi-fictionalized account of Zheng Yi Sao, based on Philip Gosse's The History of Piracy, appeared in Jorge Luis Borges' short story The Widow Ching, Lady Pirate (part of A Universal History of Infamy (1935)), where she is described as "a lady pirate who operated in Asian waters, all the way from the Yellow Sea to the rivers of the Annam coast", and who, after surrendering to the imperial forces, is pardoned and allowed to live the rest of her life as an opium smuggler. In the story, Borges repeated the incorrect claim that the pirate codes were issued by Zheng Yi Sao.

In 2020, Angela Eiter finished the first ascent of the mountain climbing route Madame Ching (which she named after Zheng Yi Sao) in Imst, Austria.

=== Arts, entertainment, and media ===
==== Film ====
- Singing Behind Screens (2003), directed by Ermanno Olmi, is loosely based on Jorge Luis Borges' short story "The Widow Ching, Lady Pirate."
- Pirates of the Caribbean: At World's End (2007), directed by Gore Verbinski, featured a character played by Takayo Fischer named Mistress Ching that is loosely based on Zheng Yi Sao.
- Madame Pirate: Becoming a Legend (2021), directed by Dan Chi Huang and Morgan Ommer, a fictional re-telling of Zheng Yi Sao's rise to power. It includes live action scenes filmed with virtual reality simulations as well. With Yi Ti Yao, Shang-Ho Huang, Ling Yuan Kung, Hao-Hsiang Hsu. Produced by Serendipity Films.

==== Literature ====
- Dragon Lady (2019) by Autumn Bardot is historical fiction, tethered by the known facts of Zheng Yi Sao (Xianggu)'s life and imaginatively filling in conversations, motivations, and relationships.
- The Flower Boat Girl (2021) by Larry Feign is a fictional novel based closely on the life of Zheng Yi Sao, incorporating historical research done by the author.
- The science fiction novel Mickey7 (2022), by Edward Ashton, refers to the first interstellar human colonial mission as having departed on a ship named the Ching Shih. A film adaptation of the novel, directed by Bong Joon-Ho, was released in 2025.
- Taiwanese-American author Rita Chang-Eppig published a fictionalized biography of Zheng Yi Sao in her debut novel Deep as the Sky, Red as the Sea (2023), referring to Zheng Yi Sao by the name she's associated with in Taiwan, Shek Yeung.

==== Television ====
- In Captain of Destiny (2015), a Hong Kong television drama, Maggie Shiu plays Shek Kiu (石嬌), who is based on Zheng Yi Sao.
- Zheng Yi Sao is portrayed by Crystal Yu in the 2022 Doctor Who special "Legend of the Sea Devils".
- In season 2 of the HBO Max series Our Flag Means Death, Zheng Yi Sao is portrayed by Ruibo Qian.

==== Video games ====
- The 2024 VR game The Pirate Queen features the player taking the role of Cheng Shih in a VR experience on a ship, and features Lucy Liu doing voice acting for the game.
- In Sid Meier's Civilization VI, players can recruit her as a Great Admiral.

==== Music ====
- British indie pop band Bastille led by frontman Dan Smith dedicate the 13th song of "&", their fifth album, to the pirate queen's story, in "Zheng Yi Sao & Questions For Her".

==== Musicals ====
- The musical Asian Pirate Musical features a version of her with various songs featuring the pirate queen. The musical album was released in July 2025.

== See also ==
- Pirates of the South China Coast
