= Battle of Tysami =

1849 naval engagement in Harlem Bay, China

- Part of Piracy in East Asia
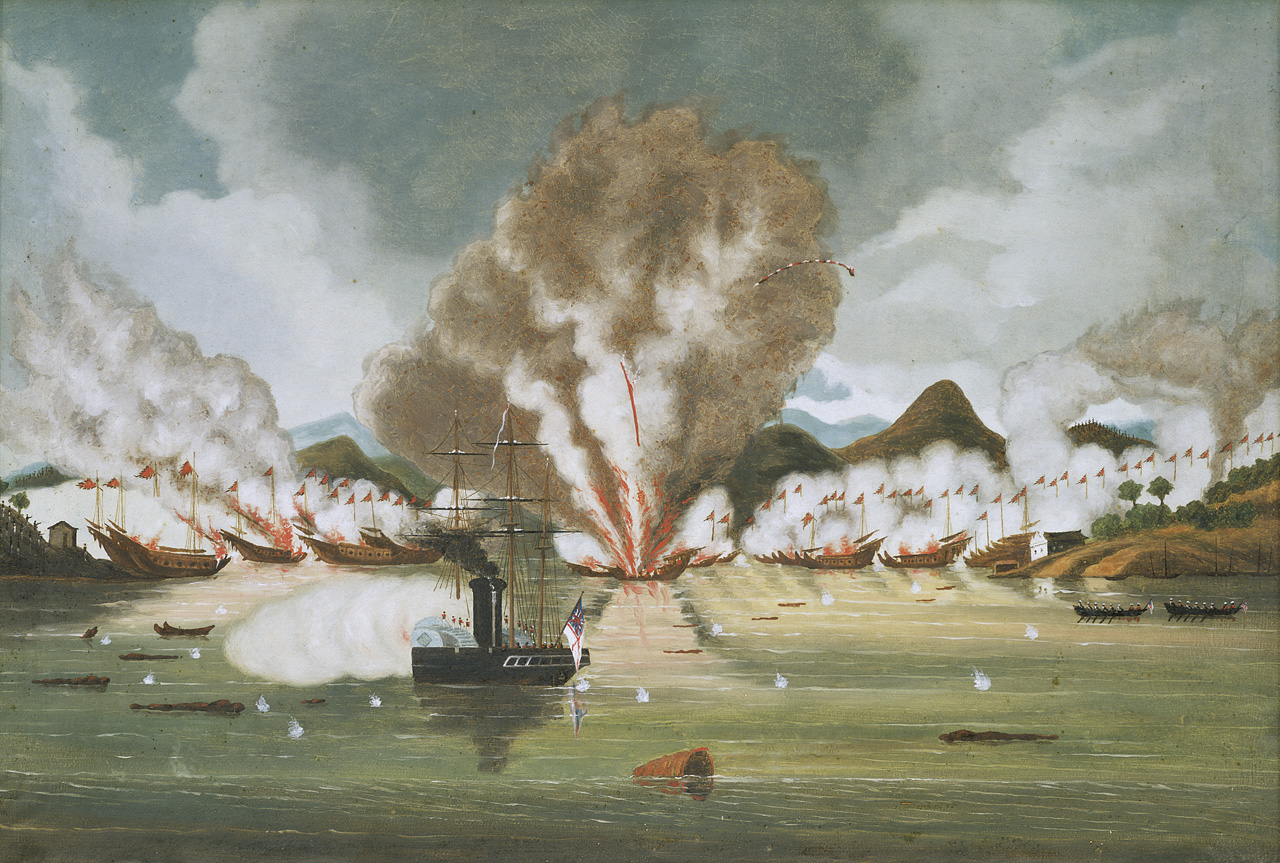
- Destruction of Chui A-poo's pirate fleet
Date	28–29 September 1849
Location	Off Tysami, Harlaim Bay, China
Result	British victory

Belligerents
United Kingdom	Chui A-poo's pirates

Commanders and leaders
(United Kingdom) John C. Hay	Chui A-poo

Strength
1 brig 1 Sloop of war 1 steamer	14 war-junks

Casualties and losses
3 killed 7 wounded 1 brig damaged 1 steamer damaged	~250 killed or wounded 4 war-junks sunk

The Battle of Tysami was a military engagement involving a warship from the British China Squadron and the Chinese pirates of Chui A-poo. It was fought in September 1849 off Tysami, Harlaim Bay, China, and ended with a Royal Navy victory. It was also the precursor engagement to the larger Battle of Pinghoi Creek where Chui A-poo's fleet was destroyed.

== Background ==
Chui A-poo is said to have commanded over 500 junks in his career as an outlaw and was a follower of Shap Ng-tsai, another famed pirate of the era. Chui A-poo's base was in Bias Bay which is next to Harlaim Bay and was the location of his harbor and arsenal for constructing war-junks. In February 1849, Chui A-poo fled Hong Kong after murdering two British officers. Intelligence gained by Assistant Superintendent Daniel Caldwell prompted the Royal Navy to respond with a task force.

At the time of the battles, Chui commanded 27 war-junks, each mounting twelve to eighteen guns and displacing an average of 500 tons. All together, about 1,800 pirates crewed them with about 200 guns in total which were found to be mostly of English manufacture.

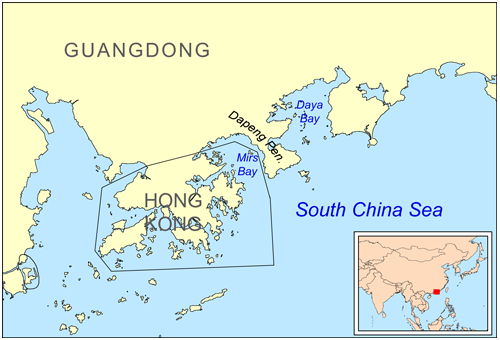
Harlaim Bay, today known as Mirs Bay, is located northeast of Hong Kong.

Commander John Charles Dalrymple Hay led the Royal Navy vessels which encountered Chui A-poo's fleet. His ship was the 12-gun brig HMS Columbine, with about 80 crewmen and 20 marines. The steamer Canton also participated, her number of crew and armament is not known but she was chartered and armed by a Lieutenant Bridges from the Peninsular and Oriental Steam Navigation Company. She arrived unsuspected at the battle area and assisted in attacking the pirates. On 27 September 1849, the Columbine left Hong Kong for Harlaim Bay and arrived at noon the following day. There they found the village to have been attacked and burnt by the pirates, who fled further northeast to the village of Tysami so the expedition went further until within plain view of the village. It was also destroyed by the pirates and was burning, smoke filled the air according to Commander Hay's report.

== Battle ==
While off the burning Tysami, at 11:00 pm the Chui A-poo and his men were spotted in fourteen large junks heading southwest in two lines of seven vessels. Hay ordered his men to battle stations, raised his colors and then gave chase. The wind was very calm but Hay counted on this as it meant his steam ships could advance while the junks could barely move. At 11:45 the Columbine fired the first shots at the largest junk closest to her. The British scored some hits but not enough to disable any of the junks. From there on the battle continued for several hours as the Columbine chased the pirates, occasionally exchanging fire. The pirates were searching for a waterway to escape through, but they found none and it was not until noon the following morning on September 29 that the main action occurred. Chui A-poo was heading west followed by Columbine when the Canton appeared, roughly in front of the war-junks. Seeing the chase, Canton's commander Lieutenant Bridges changed course into the direction of the pirates in order to assist Commander Hay.

Heading right for the junks, Canton opened up with her guns and by the time she was receiving enemy fire, Hay's ship came within range and engaged. After a few more minutes of accurate fire, Chui A-poo's fleet scattered and three junks were abandoned by their crews, most of whom drowned as their vessels were sunk around them. Towards the end of the engagement, shots from the Columbine hit one of the larger junks and it exploded, sending up a large plume of smoke. Ten junks escaped the battle due to the British who chose not to continue the chase for they had an idea about where the brigands were going. The British had already been at station non-stop for forty hours, another reason for abandoning the pursuit. Chui A-poo's pirates were reported to have suffered 250 casualties and a total of over 200 cannon were destroyed or captured and then taken back to Hong Kong. Three Royal Navy sailors were killed on the Columbine and one officer and six men wounded.

== Aftermath ==
The ten remaining war-junks anchored at the entrance of Bias Bay. Unbeknownst to the British, thirteen additional junks were nearby. Chui A-poo survived the battle, but the danger was not over yet. Commander Hay ordered that on 1 October, the remaining junks be attacked, so he sent a letter to Rear Admiral Sir Francis Augustus Collier requesting reinforcements while he prepared for further fighting. Collier dispatched the small six-gun sloop-of-war HMS Fury to the scene along with boats of marines from HMS Hastings. Under Commander John Willcox, the Fury arrived off Bias Bay where the Columbine and Canton were anchored. The pirates at this time fled further into the bay, but were still trapped by the Royal Navy. Only the small Pinghoi Creek provided a possible avenue for departure. On 1 October, the British attacked, destroying 23 additional junks and Chui A-poo's base of operations.

== See also ==
- Golden Age of Piracy
