= Zheng Yi (pirate) =

Chinese pirate (1765–1807)

- 鄭一
- Born: Zheng Wenxian (鄭文顯); 1765; Xin'an County, Guangdong, Qing China
- Died: November 16, 1807 (aged 41–42); Việt Nam
- Occupation: Pirate
- Spouse: Ching Shih (m. 1801)
- Children: Zheng Yingshi (son); Zheng Xiongshi (son)
- Parent: Zheng Lianchang (father)
- Relatives: Zheng San (brother); Zheng Qi (cousin); Cheung Po Tsai (adopted son)
- Piratical career
- Nickname: Zheng Yi
- Other names: Zheng Youyi; Zheng Yilang
- Type: Pirate
- Allegiance: Red Flag Fleet
- Years active: Late 1700s – early 1800s
- Rank: fleet commander
- Base of operations: Leizhou Peninsula, South China Sea
- Commands: Red Flag Fleet (300 ships of 20,000–40,000 pirates)

Zheng Yi

Chinese name
- Traditional Chinese: 鄭一
- Simplified Chinese: 郑一
- Literal meaning: Zheng the First
Transcriptions
Standard Mandarin
- Hanyu Pinyin: Zhèng Yī
- Wade–Giles: Cheng I
Yue: Cantonese
- Yale Romanization: Jihng Yāt
- Jyutping: Zeng6 Jat1

Zheng Wenxian
- Traditional Chinese: 鄭文顯
- Simplified Chinese: 郑文显
Transcriptions
Standard Mandarin
- Hanyu Pinyin: Zhèng Wénxiǎn

Youyi (courtesy name)
- Chinese: 耀一
Transcriptions
Standard Mandarin
- Hanyu Pinyin: Yàoyī

Zheng Yilang
- Traditional Chinese: 鄭一郎
- Simplified Chinese: 郑一郎
- Literal meaning: Zheng's First Son
Transcriptions
Standard Mandarin
- Hanyu Pinyin: Zhèng Yīláng

Vietnamese name
- Vietnamese: Trịnh Nhất

Zheng Yi (also romanised as Cheng Yud or Cheng I; born Zheng Wenxian, courtesy name Youyi; 1765 – 16 November 1807) was a powerful Chinese pirate operating from Guangdong and throughout the South China Sea in the late 1700s.

== Early life ==
He was born Zheng Wenxian in 1765 in Xin'an County (modern Shenzhen and Hong Kong), South China. His family, including his father Zheng Lianchang and his younger brother Zheng San had been pirates for generations, he and other pirates were recruited as mercenaries by Tây Sơn dynasty up until 1801.

== Marriage and children ==
In 1801, he met a 26-year-old Cantonese pirate known as Shi Xianggu (Chinese: 石香姑; Jyutping: sek6 hoeng1 gu1). Either due to infatuation with her or purely as a business move, Zheng Yi made a proposal of marriage to Shi Xianggu to consolidate power, which she is said to have agreed to under a formal contract that granted her a 50% control and share. Shi Xianggu was known as "Zheng Yi Sao" (simplified Chinese: 郑一嫂; traditional Chinese: 鄭一嫂; pinyin: zhèng yī sǎo; lit. 'wife of Zheng Yi'. They adopted Cheung Po as their step-son, making him Zheng's legal heir. She also bore him two sons; Zheng Ying Shi (simplified Chinese: 郑英石; traditional Chinese: 鄭英石; pinyin: zhèng yīng shí) and Zheng Xiong Shi (simplified Chinese: 郑雄石; traditional Chinese: 鄭雄石; pinyin: Zhèng xióng shí).

Around 1798 to 1801, Zheng Yi kidnapped Cheung Po Tsai (simplified Chinese: 张保; traditional Chinese: 張保; pinyin: zhāng bǎo), a 15-year-old son of a Tankan fisherman and pressed him into piracy. Cheung Po's talent helped him adapt well to his new and unplanned career, as he rose swiftly through the ranks. Zheng Yi then appointed Cheung Po as a captain of one of his Red Flag ships. Cheung Po eventually became both Zheng Yi's adopted son.

== Piracy career ==
According to Antony, "From 1802 until his death in a typhoon in the Southern Ocean in 1807, the most formidable pirate leader in Guandong was Zheng Yi, a cousin of Zheng Qi. Both Zhengs belonged to a notorious family of professional pirates, which for nearly a century and a half were the predominant pirates in the Canton delta. They traced their beginnings to the mid-seventeenth century with Zheng Jian, who hailed from Fujian and was subordinate of Zheng Chenggong. Two descendants, the brothers Zheng Lianfu and Zheng Lianchang, carried on the family tradition as sea bandits. They in turn were followed by their sons, Zheng Qi and Zheng Yi. After the death of Zheng Qi in 1802, Zheng Yi took command of his cousin's forces."

Around 1805, Zheng Yi rose to become the leader of a group of six Asian pirate chiefs. This coalition was a formidable force, and one of the most powerful pirate fleets in all of China. They were known as the Red Flag Fleet. Most of his fleet, which numbered over 200 ships, consisted of junks. These were sizable ships capable of holding 800 tons of cargo and armed with as many as 40 cannons. Those ships were manned by at least 20,000 sailers, and the total number of men under his leadership could have reached as many as 40,000.

The pirate coalition besieged Macau for several weeks in 1804. In September 1805, a Chinese attack consisting of 80 gunboats in Guangzhou Bay captured or destroyed only 26 pirate vessels. The general who had led the attack subsequently offered pardons to those who surrendered. Perhaps 3000 accepted this offer before it was withdrawn in December 1805.

By 1806, virtually every Chinese vessel along the coast paid the pirates for ostensible protection.

== Death ==
Zheng Yi died suddenly in Vietnam under the Nguyễn regime on 16 November 1807. Sources varied on whether he died in a typhoon, falling overboard in an accident, or if he was killed by his wife, or his new heir. Soon after his death, his widow Ching Shih (simplified Chinese: 郑氏; traditional Chinese: 鄭氏; pinyin: Zhèng Shì; meaning "widow of Zheng") acted quickly to solidify the partnership with her step-son Cheung Po Tsai. The two soon became intimate. Their first success came when they are able to secure the loyalty of Zheng's relatives. Cheung Po Tsai, would act as Ching Shih's second-in-command of the Red Flag Fleet.

== See also ==
- Pirates of the South China Coast

== Bibliography ==
- Dian H. Murray, Pirates of the South China Coast, 1790-1810 (Stanford University Press, 1987)
- Robert J. Antony, Like Froth Floating on the Sea: The World of Pirates and Seafarers in Late Imperial South China (Institute of East Asian Studies, University of California, Berkeley, 2003)
- Urvija Banerji, The Chinese Female Pirate Who Commanded 80,000 Outlaws (Atlas Obscura 2016)
- Rogozinski Jan, Dictionary of Pirates ( Wordsworth Editions Ltd, 1999)
- Ciaran Conliffe, Cheung Po Tsai and Ching Shih, Pirate Monarchs (Head Stuff, August 2017)
