= Battle of Nam Quan =

1853 battle in China

- Part of Piracy in Asia
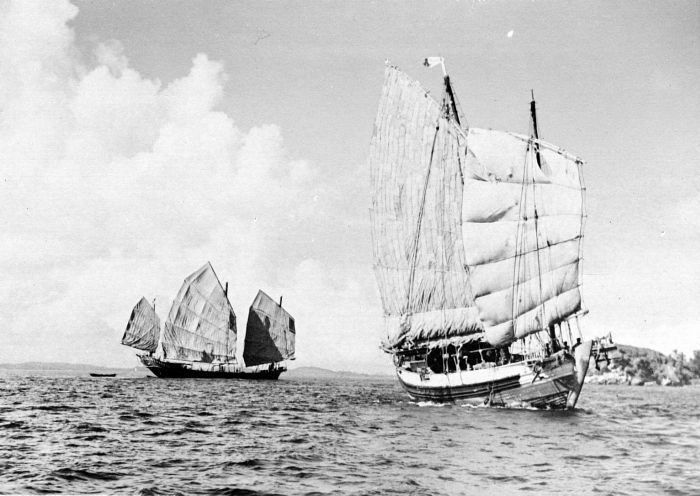
- A picture of a Chinese junk (left) and a lorcha (right).
| Date | May 10, 1853 |
| Location | off Nam Quan, China, South China Sea |
| Result | Anglo/Chinese victory |

Belligerents
| United Kingdom; Qing dynasty | Chinese Pirates |

Strength
| Land: Unknown number of Chinese civilians Sea: 1 sloop-of-war | Land: ~500 pirates Sea: 1 lorcha 7 war-junks |

Casualties and losses
| British: 3 killed 1 sloop-of-war damaged Chinese: unknown | ~500 killed or wounded 3 war-junks sunk 1 lorcha captured 4 war-junks captured |
- Several captured merchant ships were present at the battle, all but one were retaken by the British.

The Battle of Nam Quan was fought in 1853 as part of a British anti-piracy operation in China. A Royal Navy sloop-of-war encountered eight pirate ships near Nam Quan and defeated them in a decisive action with help from armed Chinese civilians on land.

== Background ==
For years the United Kingdom, the Qing dynasty, the United States and the Portuguese of Macao operated against the pirates of southwestern China. It took decades to finally clear the South China Sea of pirate junks. The largest problem was that the western and Chinese navies did not have the naval strength to combat the pirates. However, operations continued despite the weakness and several significant battles were fought. Usually the sailors of the navies were heavily out-numbered, but they were not out-gunned by the pirates, and so this did not prevent them from hunting and engaging the brigands wherever found. The RN's biggest problem was finding them.

== Battle ==
HMS Rattler, of 12 guns, was one of the Royal Navy vessels assigned to counter piracy. In the early 1850s she participated in several actions with pirates. On 10 May 1853 Rattler found pirates off Nam Quan, which is near the present day border with Vietnam. Just days before, the pirates had captured a convoy of merchant ships. The pirates were holding the vessels off Nam Quan and demanding that a ransom be paid for their release. When Rattler approached she opened fire at long range on the pirate flagship. The pirate flagship returned fire but was quickly sunk. Rattler then engaged a second junk and sank her too with gunfire before moving on to capture a third which was burned and then sunk.

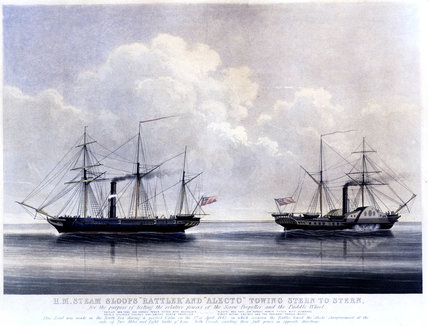
HMS Rattler (right) and HMS Alecto in 1845.

Disheartened, the remaining pirate ships broke off the action and were beached by their crews. At least half of the 1,000 pirates escaped to shore but most of them were attacked by Chinese militia and killed. One group, after their ship was grounded, took over a merchant junk, killed its crew, and began to flee. The British sent their cutter after it but when it closed in on the junk, the pirates opened fire and repulsed the attack. Three Britons, one officer and two enlisted men, were killed. Out of over 1,000 pirates, 500 were estimated to have been killed or wounded; the British took no prisoners. The British took and refloated all four of the beached junks and the one lorcha. Eighty-four cannons were also taken along with the remaining merchant ships; one captured junk escaped.

== See also ==
- Battle of Fatshan Creek
- First and Second Opium Wars
