= Zheng Qi (pirate) =

18th-century Chinese pirate

- 鄭七
- Born: Zheng Yaohuang (鄭耀煌); 1760; Xin'an County, Guangdong, Qing China
- Died: 1802 (aged 41–42); Nguyễn Vietnam
- Cause of death: execution
- Spouse: unknown
- Children: Zheng Baoyang (son); Zheng Weifeng (son)
- Parent(s): Zheng Lianfu (father); Lin Xiu (mother)
- Relatives: Zheng Yaori (brother); Zheng Yaoyue (brother); Zheng Yaoxing (brother); Zheng Yaoming (brother); Zheng Yaohuang (brother); Zheng Yaozhen (brother); Zheng Yi (cousin); Ching Shih (cousin-in-law); Zhang Lianke (nephew); He Song (adopted son)
- Piratical career
- Nickname: Zheng Qi
- Type: Pirate
- Allegiance: Pirates of the South China Coast
- Years active: late 1700s
- Rank: fleet commander
- Base of operations: Guangdong, South China Sea

Zheng Qi

Chinese name
- Traditional Chinese: 鄭七
- Simplified Chinese: 郑七
- Literal meaning: Zheng the Seventh
Transcriptions
Standard Mandarin
- Hanyu Pinyin: Zhèng Qī
- Wade–Giles: Cheng Ch'i

Zheng Yaohuang
- Traditional Chinese: 鄭耀煌
- Simplified Chinese: 郑耀煌
Transcriptions
Standard Mandarin
- Hanyu Pinyin: Zhèng Yàohuáng

Vietnamese name
- Vietnamese: Trịnh Thất

Zheng Qi (also spelled Ching Tsih or Cheng Chi; born Zheng Yaohuang; 1760 – September 1802) was a powerful Chinese pirate operating from Canton (Guangdong) and throughout the South China Sea in the late 18th century.

== History ==
He was born Zheng Yaohuang in Xin'an County, Guangdong, Qing China (modern Shenzhen and Hong Kong), in 1760. He was the seventh son of his pirate father Zheng Lianfu (鄭連福) and his wife Lin Xiu (林秀), hence the nickname Zheng Qi.

Zheng Qi was recruited by the Tay Son dynasty in 1788, and later became one of the most important subordinates under Chen Tianbao. From 1788 to 1799, Zheng frequently attacked the southern coast of Qing China together with Mo Guanfu, Liang Wengeng (梁文庚) and Fan Wencai (樊文才). The Qing navy feared them.

In 1795, Zheng Qi abducted a 12-year-old boy named He Song (何送) and raised him as his adopted son. A few years later, Zheng Qi gave him a captive female as his bride and seven hundred pieces of silver (liang) to set up store for the pirate trade. He would later bestow three ships under He Song's command.

Tay Son army was defeated by his rival the Nguyen lord in 1801, and his three comrades Mo Guanfu, Liang Wengeng and Fan Wencai were captured. Zheng Qi returned to his base in Quảng Ninh and did not want to get involved in the civil war. However, he was later persuaded by Chen Tianbao, heading his troops to Thăng Long (modern Hanoi) to aid the king. He was appointed as the Grand Marshal (Vietnamese: Đại Tư Mã, chữ Hán: 大司馬) by the Tay Son emperor Nguyễn Quang Toản.

== Death ==
Zheng Qi got involved in the siege of Đồng Hới, and his fleet was defeated in the mouth of Nhật Lệ River by the Nguyễn general Nguyễn Văn Trương, he had to flee back to his base area. In September 1802, he was captured and executed by the Nguyen dynasty.

His cousin Zheng Yi then took over.

== See also ==
- Pirates of the South China Coast
- Zheng Yi
- Ching Shih
- Cheung Po Tsai
