= Mo Guanfu =

Chinase pirate

Mo Guanfu (Chinese: 莫觀扶; Wade–Giles: Mo Kuan-fu, Chinese: 莫官扶; Vietnamese: Mạc Quan Phù, ?–1801) was a powerful Chinese pirate throughout the South China Sea in the late 1700s.

Mo was born to a woodsman's family in Suixi County, Guangdong. He was kidnapped by the pirates in 1787. His family was too poor to pay ransom, so he had to join in the pirate group.

He received a Tay Son dynasty commission in 1788, along with Chen Tien-pao, and was granted the title Đông Hải Vương (chữ Hán: 東海王, prince of East Sea) by Nguyễn Huệ. From 1788 to 1799, Mo frequently attacked the southern coast of Qing China together with Zheng Qi, Liang Wengeng (梁文庚) and Fan Wencai (樊文才).

Tay Son army was utterly beaten by his rival Nguyen lord in 1801 and, Mo was captured by Nguyen lord together with Liang Wen-keng and Fan Wen-tsai. They were extradited to China in 1803 and later executed by Lingchi in Guangzhou.

== See also ==
- Pirates of the South China Coast
