= Shap-ng-tsai =

Chinese pirate

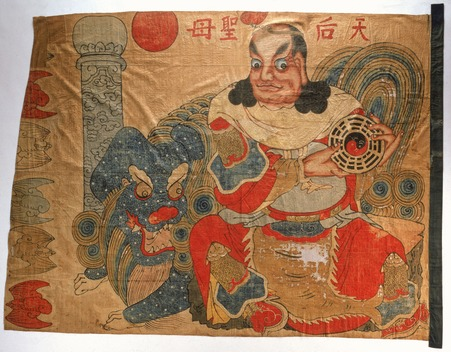
- Reputed flag of Shap-ng-tsai, c. 1849
- Piratical career
- Years active: 1845–1859
- Base of operations: Dianbai, China
- Later work: Officer in Chinese military

Shap-ng-tsai (Chinese: 十五仔) was a Chinese pirate active in the South China Sea from about 1845 to 1859. He was one of the two most notorious South China Sea pirates of the era, along with Chui A-poo. He commanded about 70 junks stationed at Dianbai, about 180 miles west of Hong Kong. Coastal villages and traders paid Shap-ng-tsai protection money so they would not be attacked. Chinese naval ships that pursued the pirate were captured and their officers taken captive and held for ransom. The Chinese government offered him a pardon and the rank of officer in the military At first he did not accept, but he eventually did so to avoid legal ramifications.

== End of pirate career ==
Shap-ng-tsai was blamed for sinking an American ship and three British merchant ships in the spring of 1849. That September, a squadron of Royal Navy ships sailed to Dianbai and found 100 captured ships there held for ransom, but failed to find the main pirate fleet. Then in October, three British ships and eight Qing navy junks pursued the pirates to the islands and channels of Haiphong, Vietnam and fought the pirates for three days. Afterwards the expedition reported the destruction of fifty-eight pirate junks carrying 1,200 cannons and 3,000 crewmen. Shap-ng-tsai escaped the battle with six smaller junks and 400 men. He later surrendered to the Chinese government and accepted the military position.

== See also ==
- Pirates of the South China Coast
