= HMS Fury (1845) =

Sloop of the Royal Navy

History

United Kingdom
- Name: HMS Fury
- Ordered: 19 February 1844
- Builder: Royal Dockyard, Sheerness
- Cost: £51,688
- Laid down: June 1845
- Launched: 31 December 1845
- Completed: 6 July 1847
- Commissioned: 20 July 1847
- Honours and awards: Kua Kam 1849; Crimea/Black Sea 1854-1855; China 1856-1860
- Fate: Sold for breaking July 1864

General characteristics
- Type: Steam Vessels (SV2); First Class Sloop
- Tons burthen: 1123 67/94 bm
- Length: 190 ft 0 in (57.9 m) gundeck; 166 ft 0.75 in (50.6 m) keel for tonnage
- Beam: 36 ft 0 in (11.0 m) maximum; 35 ft 8 in (10.9 m) for tonnage
- Draught: 8 ft 5 in (2.6 m) forward; 8 ft 5.5 in (2.6 m) aft
- Depth of hold: 21 ft 0 in (6.4 m)
- Installed power: 515 NHP
- Propulsion: 2-cylinder VSE direct acting steam engine; Paddles
- Armament: 2 × 42-pdr (84 cwt) MLSB guns on pivot mounts; 2 × 68-pdr (64 cwt) MLSB guns on broadside trucks; 2 × 42-pdr (22 cwt) carronades; 1862 Armament change; 1 × 68-pdr 95 cwt or 110=pdr 82 cwt on pivot mount; 4 × 32-pdr 42 cwt MLSB guns on broadside trucks

HMS Fury was a Bulldog-class sloop designed by Sir William Symonds, Surveyor of the Navy. She was ordered on 19 February 1844. After commissioning she sailed for the East Indies and participated in action against pirate junks near Vietnam. She then was in the Black Sea for the Crimean War followed by the Second Opium War with China. She was sold for breaking in July 1864.

Fury was the eighth named vessel since it was used for a 14-gun sloop, launched by Lime & Mackenzie of Leith on 18 March 1779 and broken in April 1787.

== Construction ==
She was ordered on 19 February 1844 from Sheerness Dockyard and her keel was laid in June 1845. She was launched on 31 December 1845. Following her launch she was towed to Liverpool to have her boilers and machinery fitted. She was then towed back to Sheerness and was completed for sea on 6 July 1847 at an initial cost of £51,688 including the hull at £24,764, machinery at £22,142 and fitting at £4,782. (Note: A total cost accounting for inflation of approximately £4,636,200 in today's money.)

== Commissioned service ==
=== First commission ===
She was commissioned on 20 July 1847 under Commander James Wilcox, RN for service on the East Indies and China Station. In conjunction with Columbine, they destroyed twenty-three pirate junks at Tysami on 29 September 1849 and a pirate fleet at Haipong on 20 to 21 October 1849. She returned to Home Waters for a refit at Woolwich Dockyard during 1851 costing £12,987.

=== Second commission ===
She was commissioned on 4 December 1851 under the command of Commander Edward Tatham, RN for service in the Mediterranean. In 1854 she was sent to the Black Sea for the Crimean War. In August 1854 Commander Ennis Chambers, RN took command. She returned to Home Waters for a refit at Portsmouth costing £23,838 during 1855–1856.

=== Third commission ===
She was commissioned on 1 August 1856 under the command of Commander Charles Taylor Leckie, RN for service on the East Indies and China Station. With Inflexible was involved with boats at Fatshan on 1 June 1857. In July 1759 Commander William Andrew James Heath, RN took command. She was in action at the Taku Forts on 26 June 1859. Commander John Crawford, RN took command on 2 January 1860. She returned to Home Waters to pay off on 19 June 1861.

== Disposition ==
She was sold to Castle & Beech in July 1864 and broken at Charlton.
