= Battle of Tonkin River =

1849 British Royal Navy action against Vietnamese pirates

- Part of Piracy in Asia
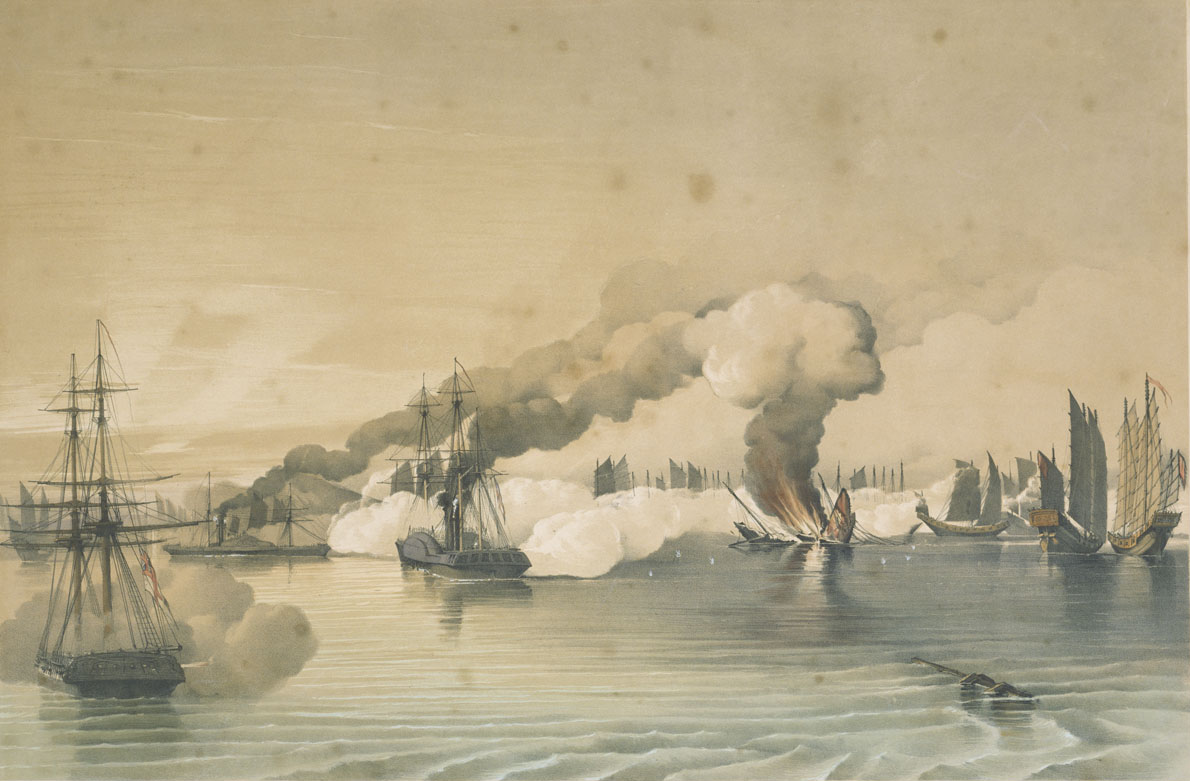
- Destruction of Shap Ng tsai's fleet
Date	October 20–22, 1849
Location	near Hai Phong, Tonkin River, Vietnam
Result	British/Chinese/Tonkinese victory

Belligerents
United Kingdom; Qing dynasty Nguyen dynasty	Shap Ng-tsai's pirates

Commanders and leaders
(United Kingdom) John C. Hay; Admiral Wong	Shap Ng-tsai

Strength
Land: unknown land forces Sea: 2 sloops-of-war 1 brig 8 war-junks	Land: ~1,400 pirates Sea: 64 war-junks

Casualties and losses
British: none 2 sloops-of-war damaged 1 brig damaged Chinese: unknown Vietnamese: unknown	~2,400 killed or wounded ~300 captured 58 junks sunk

The Battle of Tonkin River was a major naval battle fought in northern Vietnam between the pirates of Shap Ng-tsai and the British Royal Navy with aid from the Qing Chinese navy and the Tonkinese. The 1849 expedition led to the destruction of Shap Ng-tsai's fleet and the loss of over 2,000 men. The battle occurred over a three-day period at the mouth of the Tonkin River, near present-day Hai Phong.

== Background ==
=== Piracy in China ===
In 1810 the government of the Qing dynasty issued a pardon to all pirates operating in China, thousands accepted and joined the Qing navy which began the decline of piracy in the Far East. However, though many pirates chose to give up their criminal ways, thousands continued pirating along the southern Chinese coast. The pirates used war-junks and occasionally other vessels as well. Several different pirate groups were active in this time and they usually operated in mass against merchant vessels. By 1847 the Royal Navy began to take more serious measures against the pirates. They had already engaged the Chinese brigands in combat as early as 1839 and it took until the late 1860s to finally put an end to fleets of pirate junks but even then piracy continued in China but was done so in a different way as new steam vessels meant a change in tactics.

=== Pirates of Shap Ng-tsai ===
Shap Ng-tsai was one Chinese pirate commander who attacked merchant ships in the mid 19th century. He commanded a fleet of around seventy junks working out of Tienpak. They varied in size and later the British commander of the battle, John Charles Dalrymple Hay, divided them into classes. Of the sixty-four he encountered at Tonkin River, the single largest junk carried forty-two guns of different poundage with a crew of 140. The second class of which there were sixteen of mounted twenty-eight to thirty-four guns and had crews of seventy-five men. The third class was smaller with twelve to nineteen guns and forty man crews, Hay counted forty-two of these vessels. There was five junks of the fourth class which were armed with six guns and had a complement of thirty pirates each. Most of the guns were reportedly long 18-pounders which were used regularly by Chinese pirates at the time. In total Commander Hay estimated that his squadron faced 1,224 enemy guns and 3,190 pirates including their leader Shap Ng-tsai who captained the junk of the first class and used her as his flagship.

=== Expedition to Tonkin ===
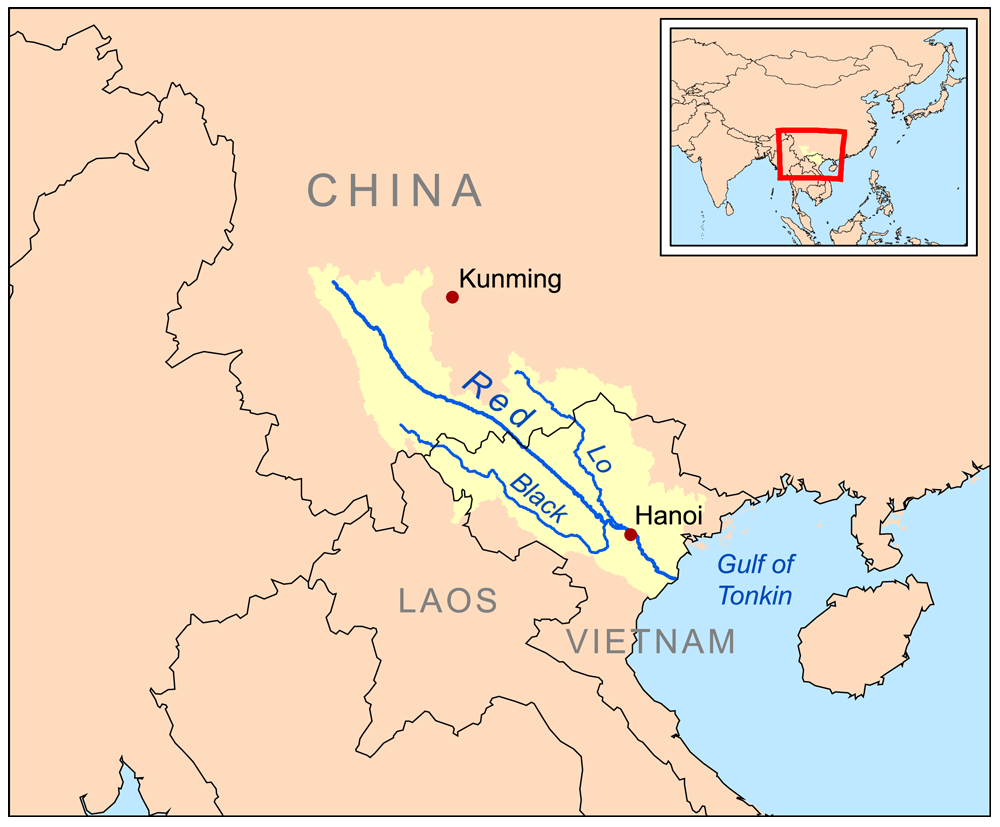
A map of the Red River which was known as the Tonkin in 1849. The battle ouccured at the mouth where the river flows into the Gulf of Tonkin.

After Shap Ng-tsai's sinking an American and two British merchant ships in spring of 1849, the British organized a squadron of three vessels to search out and destroy the pirates. They were the brig HMS Columbine, the sloop-of-war HMS Fury and the East India Company sloop HMS Phlegethon, each mounting twelve to eighteen guns and with crews of around 100 men. An unspecified number of Royal Marines also participated along with boats and sailors from HMS Hastings. Phlegethon was John Hay's flagship and was used to tow the Columbine through shallow water. Sailing from Hong Kong on October 8, of 1849, Commander Hay headed south along the Chinese coast for Concock where he began his search and after sailing through several ports without finding the pirates, he decided to go to Hoi-How where he met with the governor general of the province. On October 13 the governor general ordered an admiral named Wong to command a force of eight small junks which accompanied Hay's expedition.

The fleet of one brig, two sloops and eight heavily armed junks then continued south for Chooshan, there on October 16 they found the town burned and many dead Chinese. Upon investigation the expedition learnt that the pirates had left five days before on October 11 and had killed many men and taken several women. From there they headed for Hoonong and on October 18 they encountered a lookout vessel of Shap Ng-tsai's fleet. Phlegethon chased her down and men in her boats destroyed the craft. On October 19, the expedition arrived at Hoonong and discovered that the pirates were at anchor twelve miles further near Chokeum in the Gulf of Tonkin. Arriving in the area on October 20, Hay decided first to complete a reconnaissance with the Phlegethon and a few boats, during which they sighted thirty-seven junks in group sailing southwest in Junk Passage for the mouth of the Tonkin river. Hay regrouped with his ships while the pirate junks searched from 7:00 am to 4:00 pm for the river's opening. When they found it, the Chinese entered, so Hay made plans for passing the bar.

== Battle ==
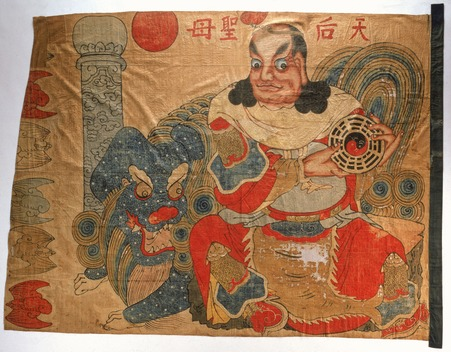
Reputed pirate flag of Shap Ng-tsai

=== October 20 ===
Hay's plan was simple, cross over the bar and attack, and at about 4:30 pm the Sino/British fleet entered the Tonkin. The first to enter was the Phlegethon with Columbine in tow and Fury astern followed by the eight Qing navy junks. Ten minutes later at 4:40 pm over thirty ships from the Chinese fleet opened fire. The initial shots mostly went over the decks of the British and Qing ships but as the expedition drew nearer the pirates began to score several hits. By this time the British and Chinese had begun accurate counter battery fire, several junks were sunk outright while others caught on fire and then sunk. After only twenty-five minutes of combat Shap Ng-tasi's flagship was hit several times and exploded with a loud boom. Shap Ng-tsai survived though and transferred his flag to one of the third-rate junks. The battle on the 20 lasted until just before 8:00 pm and a total of twenty-seven pirate junks were sunk and hundreds killed. While the Qing navy suffered a few casualties the British lost no one killed or wounded. When it became dark that night the expedition disengaged, lowered anchor and began a blockade of the river.

=== October 21 ===
Though they had lost almost half of their fleet, the pirates of Shap Ng-tsai chose to continue the battle. On October 21, the expedition attacked again. This time several of the junks were in too shallow water to be chased by large warships so several boats were lowered and armed with one cannon apiece and crewed by sailors and marines. They, under Lieutenant George Hancock and Captain Moore of the marines attacked several of the pirate junks in close quarters boarding actions. Nine junks were taken by the lieutenant's flotilla of boats that day and another fifteen were destroyed by other elements of the expedition. Having taken heavy losses the pirates chose to flee further up the river. Two of the second-rate junks were ordered to head for Tonkin Bay and fend off the attacking British sloops while the remaining junks fled. Both of these vessels were boarded and then sunk by gunfire after an hour and twenty minutes of fighting. During the three days of battle over 1,400 pirates made it ashore onto the small islands at the river's mouth when their junks were sunk. Armed with only muskets and matchlocks they fought from the coasts by firing their rifles at the expeditionary forces until attacked by Tonkinese land forces and several armed boats. At least 700 pirates were killed on land and about 300 were captured and handed over to the British.

=== October 22 ===
On October 22, Commander Hay in the Phlegethon, with some of the boats, went to destroy the remaining pirate ships. That day the Qing navy destroyed four junks and after regrouping with Hay, they sunk two more. Clearly defeated; Shap Ng-tsai took two third-rate and four fourth-rate junks with his 400 remaining men and retreated further up the river. That marked the end of the combat. A total of fifty-eight junks were destroyed with an estimated 2,400 killed or wounded and about 300 captured. Over 1,200 pirate guns were also captured. One significant factor of the battle was that not one man under Hay's command was killed or wounded but the Chinese and Vietnamese did suffer some casualties. All of the expedition ships were damaged in some way including at least three of the armed boats which were raked by cannon fire.

== Aftermath ==
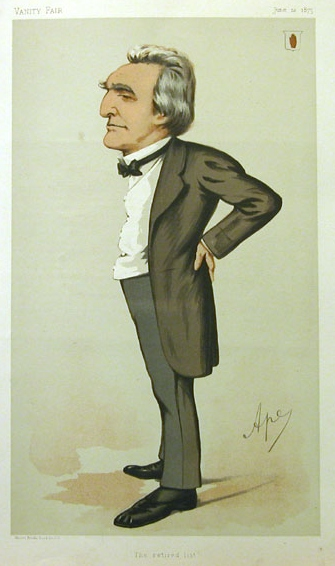
A Vanity Fair picture of Commander Hay around the time of his retirement

The battle was a major success in the fight against Chinese pirates in the mid 19th century. Commander Hay and several men under him later received recognition for their action in the fight and on January 20, 1850, Hay was promoted to the rank of captain and later admiral before becoming a Privy Counsellor in the 1870s. With his fleet destroyed Shap Ng-tsai ended his career as a pirate and accepted an officer's position in the Chinese navy. He and Commander Hay later served against each other during the Second Opium War of 1856 to 1860.

== See also ==
- Golden Age of Piracy
