= Chen Tianbao =

Chen Tianbao (Chinese: 陳添保; Wade–Giles: Ch'en T'ien-pao; Vietnamese: Trần Thiên Bảo) was a fisherman who became a powerful Chinese Warlord operating from Guangdong and throughout the South China Sea in the late 18th century. He later became a general and naval commander of the Tay Son dynasty in Vietnam.

Chen was born to a fisherman's family in Lianzhou, Guangdong (modern Hepu County, Guangxi). In October 1780, his fishing vessel was shipwrecked near northern Vietnam, and he had to stay there.

When the Tay Son brothers conquered northern Vietnam, he was forced to join the Tay Son army in 1783. He was very skilled at sailing and was later appointed as general. He was the commander of Tay Son navy and helped Tay Son against the threats from the sea. From 1788 to 1799, he ordered his four subordinates, Mo Guanfu, Zheng Qi, Liang Wengeng (梁文庚) and Fan Wencai (樊文才), all Chinese pirates, to launch frequent attacks on the southern coast of Qing China.

Chen also played an important role during the civil war between Tay Son and the Nguyen lords. After the Tay Son army was utterly beaten by the Nguyen lords in 1801, he fled to Guangdong and surrendered to Qing China. The Jiaqing Emperor pardoned him because he was forced into piracy due to Tay Son's forced conscription and allowed him to reside in Nanxiong further away from the coastal areas.

== See also ==
- Pirates of the South China Coast
- Tây Sơn military tactics and organization
