= Nguyễn dynasty =

Last dynasty of Vietnam (1802–1945)

Đại Việt 大越國 (1802–1804) Việt Nam 越南國 (1804–1839; 1945) Đại Nam 大南國 (1839–1945)
- 1802–1945 (Note: The predecessors of this dynasty were the Nguyễn lords (1558–1777, 1780–1802). After it collapsed with the abdication of Bảo Đại, he continued to hold the title of "Emperor" of the State of Vietnam from 1949 to 1955.)
- Court flag (c. 1920s–1945) Coat of arms
- Anthem: Đăng đàn cung ("The Emperor Mounts His Throne")
- Heirloom Seal of the Southern Realm; Đại Nam thụ thiên vĩnh mệnh truyền quốc tỷ 大南受天永命傳國璽 (1846–1945)

- Vietnam at its greatest extent (1835–1841) under the latter reign of Emperor Minh Mạng Vietnam in 1841 Sphere of influence Sphere of influence Vassal state lost in 1841

- Administrative divisions of Việt Nam in 1838 during the reign of Emperor Minh Mạng.
- Status: Internal imperial system within Chinese tributary (1802–1883); French protectorate (1883–1945); Puppet state of the Empire of Japan (1945)
- Capital: Phú Xuân (now part of Huế); 16°28′N 107°36′E
- Official languages: Literary Chinese (Note: The use of the Classical Chinese language in documents and correspondences is distinct from the use of the Chữ Nôm writing system for the Vietnamese language.) (written, 1802–1884); French (from 1884)
- Common languages: Vietnamese
- Religion: State ideology: Ruism; Minority: Mahayana Buddhism, Caodaism, Christianity, Folk religion, Hòa Hảo, Hinduism, Islam, and Taoism
- Demonym: Vietnamese
- Government: Absolute monarchy
- Emperor
  - 1802–1820 (first): Gia Long
  - 1883 (last independent): Hiệp Hòa
  - 1926–1945 (last): Bảo Đại
- Regent
  - 1818–1820: Minh Mạng
  - 1883–1885: Tôn Thất Thuyết & Nguyễn Văn Tường
- Prime Minister
  - 1945: Trần Trọng Kim
- Legislature: None (rule by decree)
- History
  - Coronation of Emperor Gia Long: 1 June 1802
  - Tây Sơn defeated: 20 July 1802
  - French invasion: 1 September 1858
  - Treaty of Saigon: 5 June 1862
  - End of independence: 25 August 1883
  - Protectorate Treaty: 6 June 1884
  - Declaration of Independence: 11 March 1945
  - Abdication of Bảo Đại: 25 August 1945

Area
- 1830: 557,000 km^{2} (215,000 sq mi)

Population
  - 1830: 10,500,000
  - 1858: 12,031,000
  - 1890: 14,752,000
  - 1942: 25,552,000
- Currency: Zinc and copper-alloy cash coins (denominated in phần, văn, mạch, and quán); Silver and gold cash coins and ingots (denominated in phân, nghi, tiền, and lạng / lượng); French Indochinese piastre (from 1885)
Preceded by
Nguyễn lords
Tây Sơn dynasty
Succeeded by
1862: Cochinchina
1883: Annam
1883: Tonkin
1945: Democratic Republic of Vietnam
1955: Republic of Vietnam
- Today part of: Vietnam; China; Laos; Cambodia

Nguyễn
- Country: State of Đại Nam (Vietnam)
- Founded: 19th century
- Founder: Nguyễn Phúc Ánh
- Final ruler: Nguyễn Phúc Vĩnh Thụy
- Titles: Emperor of Đại Nam/ Emperor of Việt Nam Titles given by the Chinese empires: King of Vietnam
- Estate: Phú Xuân
- Deposition: 1945

The Nguyễn dynasty (Vietnamese: Nhà Nguyễn, chữ Nôm: 茹阮) was the last Vietnamese dynasty, preceded by the Nguyễn lords and ruling unified Vietnam independently from 1802 until the start of the French protectorate in 1883. Its emperors were members of the House of Nguyễn Phúc. During its existence, the Nguyễn empire expanded into modern-day Southern Vietnam, Cambodia, and Laos through a continuation of the centuries-long Nam tiến and Siamese–Vietnamese wars. With the French conquest of Vietnam, the Nguyễn dynasty was forced to give up sovereignty over parts of Southern Vietnam (Cochinchina) to France in 1862 and 1874, and after 1883 the Nguyễn dynasty only nominally ruled the French protectorates of Annam (Central Vietnam) as well as Tonkin (Northern Vietnam). Backed by Imperial Japan, in 1945 the last Nguyễn emperor Bảo Đại abolished the protectorate treaty with France and proclaimed the Empire of Vietnam for a short time until 25 August 1945.

The House of Nguyễn Phúc established control over large amounts of territory in Southern Vietnam as the Nguyễn lords (1558–1777, 1780–1802) by the 16th century before defeating the Tây Sơn dynasty and establishing their own imperial rule in the 19th century. The dynastic rule began with Gia Long ascending the throne in 1802, after ending the previous Tây Sơn dynasty. The Nguyễn dynasty was gradually absorbed by France over the course of several decades in the latter half of the 19th century, beginning with the Cochinchina Campaign in 1858 which led to the occupation of the southern area of Vietnam. A series of unequal treaties followed; the occupied territory became the French colony of Cochinchina in the 1862 Treaty of Saigon, and the 1863 Treaty of Huế gave France access to Vietnamese ports and increased control of its foreign affairs. Finally, the 1883 and 1884 Treaties of Huế divided the remaining Vietnamese territory into the protectorates of Annam and Tonkin under nominal Nguyễn Phúc rule. In 1887, Cochinchina, Annam, Tonkin, and the French Protectorate of Cambodia were grouped together to form French Indochina.

The Nguyễn dynasty remained the formal emperors of Annam and Tonkin within Indochina until World War II. Japan had occupied Indochina with French collaboration in 1940, but as the war seemed increasingly lost, Japan overthrew the French administration on 9 March 1945 and the Nguyễn dynasty proclaimed independence for its constituent protectorates two days later. It also regained Cochinchina on 14 August 1945. The Empire of Vietnam under Nguyễn Emperor Bảo Đại was a nominally independent state but actually a Japanese puppet state during the last months of the war. It ended with the abdication of Bảo Đại following the surrender of Japan then August Revolution led by the communist Việt Minh in August 1945. This ended the 143-year rule of the Nguyễn dynasty. Bảo Đại was later restored to power to become head of state of the State of Vietnam in 1949 until the country became a republic in 1955.

== Names ==
=== Việt Nam ===
- Country of Vietnam
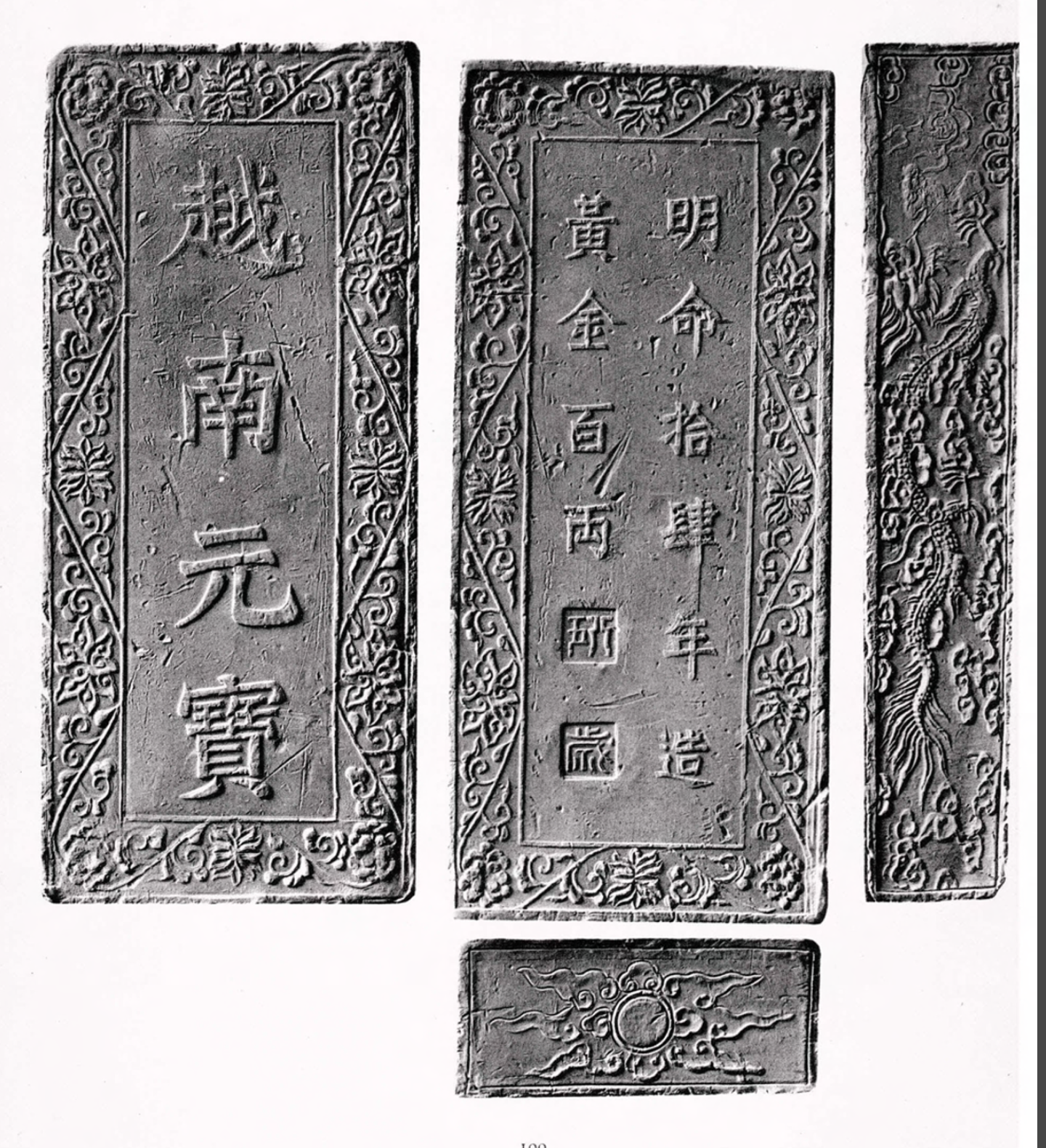
- A Việt Nam Nguyên Bảo (越南元寶), gold sycee of 10 taels produced during the Minh Mạng period.
- Vietnamese alphabet: Nước Việt Nam
- Hán-Nôm: 渃越南

The name Việt Nam (Vietnamese pronunciation: [viə̀t naːm], chữ Hán: 越南) is a variation of Nam Việt ( 南越; literally "Southern Việt"), a name that can be traced back to the Triệu Dynasty of the second century BC. The term "Việt" (Yue) (Chinese: 越; pinyin: Yuè; Cantonese Yale: Yuht; Wade–Giles: Yüeh^{4}; Vietnamese: Việt) in Early Middle Chinese was first written using the logograph "戉" for an axe (a homophone), in oracle bone and bronze inscriptions of the late Shang Dynasty (c. 1200 BC), and later as "越". At that time it referred to a people or chieftain to the northwest of the Shang. In the early eighth century BC, a tribe on the middle Yangtze were called the Yangyue, a term later used for peoples further south. Between the seventh and fourth centuries BC Yue/Việt referred to the State of Yue in the lower Yangtze basin and its people. From the third century BC the term was used for the non-Chinese populations of south and southwest China and northern Vietnam, with particular ethnic groups called Minyue, Ouyue, Luoyue (Vietnamese: Lạc Việt), etc., collectively called the Baiyue (Bách Việt, Chinese: 百越; pinyin: Bǎiyuè; Cantonese Yale: Baak Yuet; Vietnamese: Bách Việt; lit. 'Hundred Yue/Viet'; ). The term Baiyue/Bách Việt first appeared in the book Lüshi Chunqiu compiled around 239 BC. By the seventeenth and eighteenth centuries, educated Vietnamese called themselves and their people as người Việt and người Nam, which combined to become người Việt Nam (Vietnamese people). However, this designation was for the Vietnamese themselves and not for the whole country.

The form Việt Nam ( 越南) is first recorded in the 16th-century oracular poem Sấm Trạng Trình. The name has also been found on 12 steles carved in the 16th and 17th centuries, including one at Bao Lam Pagoda in Hải Phòng that dates to 1558. In 1802, Nguyễn Phúc Ánh (who later became Emperor Gia Long) established the Nguyễn dynasty. In the second year of his rule, he asked the Jiaqing Emperor of the Qing dynasty to confer on him the title 'King of Nam Việt / Nanyue' (南越 in Chinese character) after seizing power in Annam. The Emperor refused because the name was related to Zhao Tuo's Nanyue, which included the regions of Guangxi and Guangdong in southern China. The Qing Emperor, therefore, decided to call the area "Việt Nam" instead. Between 1804 and 1813, the name Vietnam was used officially by Emperor Gia Long. (Note: At first, Gia Long requested the name "Nam Việt", but the Jiaqing Emperor refused.)

=== Đại Nam ===
- State of Đại Nam
- Vietnamese alphabet: Đại Nam Quốc
- Chữ Hán: 大南國

In 1839, under the rule of Emperor Minh Mạng's, the official name of the state was Đại Việt Nam (大越南, which means "Great Vietnam"), and it was shortened to Đại Nam (大南, which means "Great South").

=== Nam Triều ===
During the 1930s its government used the name Nam Triều (南朝, Southern dynasty) on its official documents.

=== Other names ===
Westerners in the past often called the kingdom Annam or the Annamite Empire. However, in Vietnamese historiography, modern historians often refer to this period in Vietnamese history as Nguyễn Vietnam, or simply Vietnam to distinguish with the pre-19th century Kingdom of Đại Việt.

== History ==
=== Background and establishment ===
==== Origin of Nguyễn clan ====
The Nguyễn clan, which originated in the Thanh Hóa Province had long exerted substantial political influence and military power throughout early modern Vietnamese history through one form or another. The clan's affiliations with the ruling elites dated back to the tenth century when Nguyễn Bặc was appointed the first grand chancellor of the short-lived Đinh dynasty under emperor Đinh Bộ Lĩnh in 968. Another instance of their influences materializes through Nguyễn Thị Anh, the empress consort of emperor Lê Thái Tông; she served as the official regent of Đại Việt for her son, the child emperor Lê Nhân Tông between 1442 and 1453.

==== Lê dynasty's loyal vassal ====
In 1527, Mạc Đăng Dung, after defeating and executing the Lê dynasty's vassal, Nguyễn Hoằng Dụ in a rebellion, emerged as the intermediate victor and established the Mạc dynasty. He did this by deposing the Lê emperor, Lê Cung Hoàng, taking the throne for himself, effectively ending the once prosperous but declining later Lê dynasty. Nguyễn Hoằng Dụ's son, Nguyễn Kim, the leader of the Nguyễn clan with his allies, the Trịnh clan remained fiercely loyal to the Lê dynasty. They attempted to restore the Lê dynasty to power, igniting an anti-Mạc rebellion, in favor of the loyalist cause. Both the Trịnh and Nguyễn clan again took up arms in Thanh Hóa province and revolted against the Mạc. However the initial rebellion failed and the loyalist forces had to fled to the kingdom of Lan Xang, where king Photisarath allows them to establish an exiled loyalist government in Xam Neua (modern day Laos). The Lê loyalists under Lê Ninh, a descendant of the imperial family, escaped to Muang Phuan (today Laos). During this exile, the Marquis of An Thanh, Nguyễn Kim summoned those who were still loyal to the Lê emperor and formed a new army to begin another revolt against Mạc Đăng Dung. In 1539, the coalition returned to Đại Việt beginning their military campaign against the Mạc in Thanh Hóa, capturing the Tây Đô in 1543.

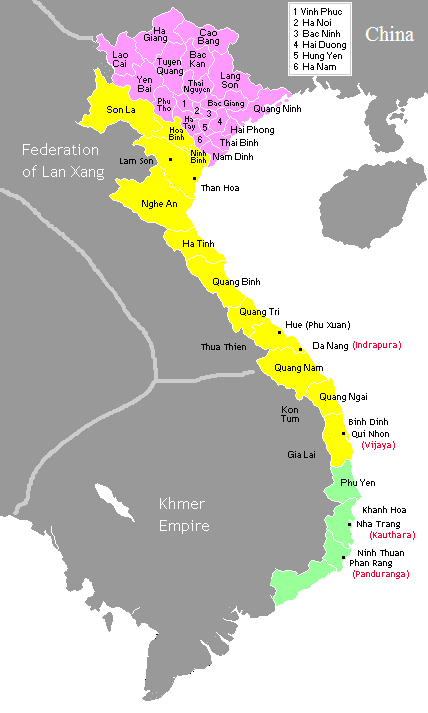
Map of Vietnam from 1540 to 1592 during Southern and Northern Dynasties period shows the division of Đại Việt between
Mạc dynasty
Lê dynasty under command of Nguyễn Kim
Kingdom of Champa

==== Nguyễn's dominion in the south ====
In 1539, the Lê dynasty was restored in opposition to the Mạc in Thăng Long, this occurred after the loyalist's capture of Thanh Hoá province, reinstalling the Lê emperor Lê Trang Tông on the throne. However, the Mạc at this point still controls most of the country, including the capital, Thăng Long. Nguyễn Kim, who had served as leader of the loyalists throughout the 12 years of the Lê–Mạc War (from 1533 to 1545) and throughout the Northern and Southern dynasties period, was assassinated in 1545 by a captured Mạc general, Dương Chấp Nhất. Shortly after Nguyễn Kim's death, his son-in-law, Trịnh Kiểm, leader of the Trịnh clan, killed Nguyễn Uông, the eldest son of Kim to take over the control of the loyalist forces. The sixth son of Kim, Nguyễn Hoàng, fears that his fate will be like his elder brother; therefore, he tried to escape the capital to avoid the purges. Later, he asks his sister, Nguyễn Thị Ngọc Bảo (the wife of Trịnh Kiểm) to ask Kiểm to appoint him to be the governor of far-south frontier of Đại Việt, Thuận Hóa (modern Quảng Bình to Quảng Nam provinces). Trịnh Kiểm, thinking of this proposal as an opportunity to remove the power and influence of Nguyễn Hoàng away from the capital city, agreed to the proposal.

In 1558, Lê Anh Tông, emperor of the newly restored Lê dynasty appointed Nguyễn Hoàng to the lordship of the Thuận Hóa, the territory which have been previously conquered during the 15th century from the Champa kingdom. This event of Nguyễn Hoàng leaving Thăng Long laid the foundation for the eventual fragmentation and division of Đại Việt later down the road as the Trịnh clan would solidify their power in the North, establishing a unique political system where the Lê emperors would reign (as figureheads) yet the Trịnh lords would rule (wielding actual political power). Meanwhile, the descendants of the Nguyễn clan, through the bloodline of Nguyễn Hoàng would rule in the South; the Nguyễn clan, just like their Trịnh relatives in the north, recognize the authority of the Lê emperors over Đại Việt yet at the same time solely exercise political power over their own territory. The official schism of the two families however, would not begin until 1627, the first war between the two.

Nguyễn Phúc Lan chose the city of Phú Xuân in 1636 as his residence and established the dominion of the Nguyễn lord in the southern part of the country. Although the Nguyễn and Trịnh lords ruled as de facto rulers in their respective lands, they paid official tribute to the Lê emperors in a ceremonial gesture, and recognize Lê dynasty as the legitimacy of Đại Việt.

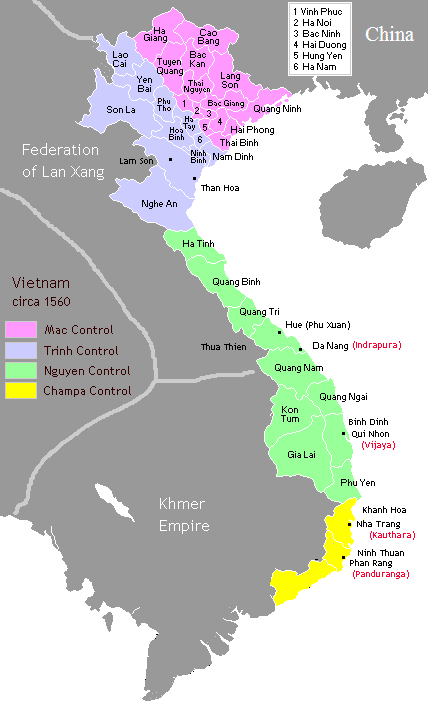
Map of Vietnam from 1569 to 1592 shows the division of Đại Việt between domains of
Nguyễn clan
when Nguyễn Hoàng was appointed as governor of Thuận Hóa and Quảng Nam
Lê dynasty under Trịnh clan's authority
Mạc dynasty
Kingdom of Champa

==== Nguyễn-Trịnh confrontation ====
Nguyễn Hoàng and his successors started to engage in rivalry with the Trịnh lords, after refusing to pay tax and tribute to the central government in Hanoi as Nguyễn lords tried to create the autonomous regime. They expanded their territory by making parts of Cambodia as a protectorate, invaded Laos, captured the last vestiges of Champa in 1693 and ruled in an unbroken line until 1776.

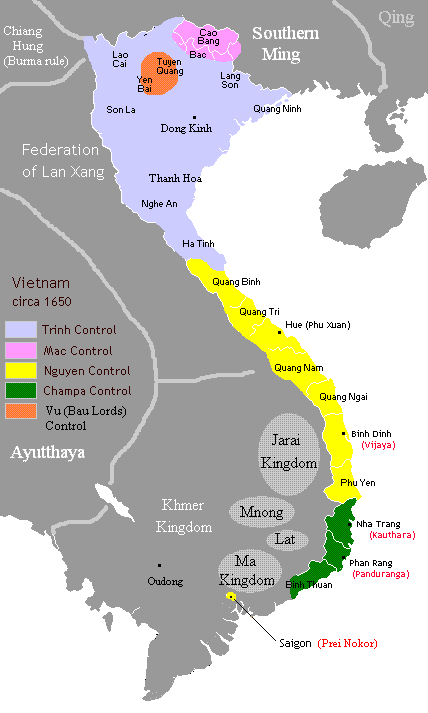
Map of Vietnam from 1627 shows the division of Đại Việt between
Nguyễn
Lê dynasty under Trịnh clan's control
Mạc as rump state
Kingdom of Champa

=== Tây Sơn–Nguyễn war (1771–1802) ===
==== The end of the Nguyễn lords' reign ====
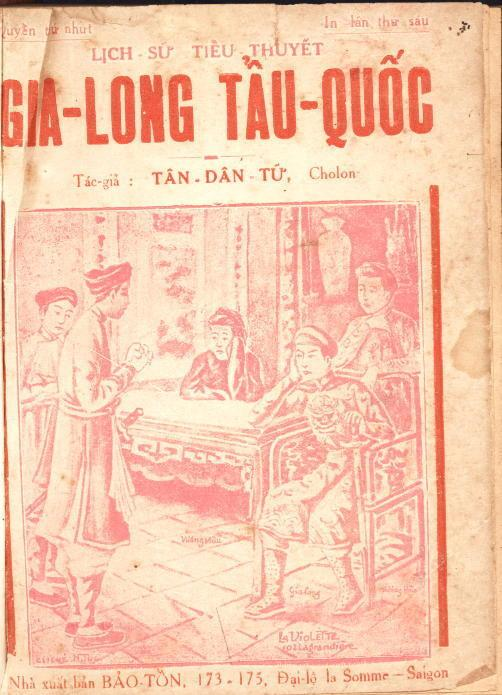
The cover of Tân Dân Tử's (1875–1955) 1930 book, Gia Long tẩu quốc, depicted the exile of Nguyễn Ánh.

The 17th-century war between the Trịnh and the Nguyễn ended in an uneasy peace, with the two sides creating de facto separate states although both professed loyalty to the same Lê dynasty. After 100 years of domestic peace, the Nguyễn lords were confronted with the Tây Sơn rebellion in 1774. Its military had had considerable losses in manpower after a series of campaigns in Cambodia and proved unable to contain the revolt. By the end of the year, the Trịnh lords had formed an alliance with the Tây Sơn rebels and captured Huế in 1775.

Nguyễn lord, Nguyễn Phúc Thuần fled south to the Quảng Nam province, where he left a garrison under co-ruler Nguyễn Phúc Dương. He fled further south to the Gia Định Province (around modern-day Ho Chi Minh City) by sea before the arrival of Tây Sơn leader Nguyễn Nhạc, whose forces defeated the Nguyễn garrison and seized Quảng Nam.

In early 1777 a large Tây Sơn force under Nguyễn Huệ and Nguyễn Lữ attacked and captured Gia Định from the sea and defeated the Nguyễn Lord forces. The Tây Sơn received widespread popular support as they presented themselves as champions of the Vietnamese people, who rejected any foreign influence and fought for the full reinstitution of the Lê dynasty. Hence, the elimination of the Nguyễn and Trinh lordships was considered a priority and all but one member of the Nguyễn family captured at Saigon were executed.

==== Nguyễn Ánh escapes ====
In 1775, the 13-year-old Nguyễn Ánh escaped and with the help of the Vietnamese Catholic priest Paul Hồ Văn Nghị soon arrived at the Paris Foreign Missions Society in Hà Tiên. With Tây Son search parties closing in, he kept on moving and eventually met the French missionary Pigneau de Behaine. By retreating to the Thổ Chu Islands in the Gulf of Thailand, both escaped Tây Sơn capture.

Pigneau de Behaine decided to support Ánh, who had declared himself heir to the Nguyễn lordship. A month later the Tây Sơn army under Nguyễn Huệ had returned to Quy Nhơn. Ánh seized the opportunity and quickly raised an army at his new base in Long Xuyên, marched to Gia Định and occupied the city in December 1777. The Tây Sơn returned to Gia Định in February 1778 and recaptured the province. When Ánh approached with his army, the Tây Sơn retreated.

By the summer of 1781, Ánh's forces had grown to 30,000 soldiers, 80 battleships, three large ships and two Portuguese ships procured with the help of de Behaine. Ánh organized an unsuccessful ambush of the Tây Sơn base camps in the Phú Yên province. In March 1782 the Tây Sơn emperor Thái Đức and his brother Nguyễn Huệ sent a naval force to attack Ánh. Ánh's army was defeated and he fled via Ba Giồng to Svay Rieng in Cambodia.

==== Nguyễn–Cambodian agreement ====
Ánh met with the Cambodian King Ang Eng, who granted him exile and offered support in his struggle with the Tây Sơn. In April 1782 a Tây Sơn army invaded Cambodia, detained and forced Ang Eng to pay tribute, and demanded, that all Vietnamese nationals living in Cambodia were to return to Vietnam.

==== Chinese Vietnamese support for Nguyễn Ánh ====
Chinese migration to Vietnam intensified with and after the 1679 migration of a large group of people from southern China who were the remnants the resistance to the Qing dynasty. They were led by the Long Mon army. They offered submission to the Nguyễn lord. This was accepted and they were allowed to settle and to explore the south. They set up businesses and trade.

In the Saigon area the Chinese settled in Ban Lan (Biên Hòa, NE of Saigon) and the nearby Cu Lao Pho islet. The latter became a bustling trading port.

In 1775 the Tây Sơn and the Thinh (the lords of Northern Vietnam) were allies. They attacked the Nguyễn lords in Hội An who had fled there after the capture of their capital, Huế. The Trinh army destroyed much of the commercial district. Only religious structures were spared. Many Nguyễn elite members and many and wealthy Chinese merchants fled south to the Saigon and Chợ Lớn. This led to many wealthy Chinese to actively support the Nguyễn lords.

When the Tây Sơn recaptured Saigon in 1778, the Emperor Thái Đức (Nguyễn Nhạc) saw the ethnic Chinese in Cu Lao Pho as an important logistical base for Anh. The Tây Sơn destroyed the town "removing all houses, bricks and stones, and transporting them to Quy Nhơn (central Vietnam). The bodies of Chinese were thrown in the river. The survivors had to take refuge in Chợ Lớn.

In 1782, when Nguyễn Ánh escaped to Cambodia and the Tây Sơn seized the Saigon area again. During the battles, the Tây Sơn grand admiral Phạm Ngạn was killed in an ambush at Tham Lương Bridge by the Hoà Nghĩa army. This was military group formed by ethnic Chinese that fought for the Nguyen lords. Thái Đức had a close relationship with him (his daughter was married to him) and was angry. According to the Đại Nam thực lục, the official history of the Nguyễn dynasty, thinking that the Hoa Nghia army was full of ethnic Chinese, he ordered to capture them in Gia Dinh (Saigon) regardless of whether they were soldiers or civilians.

In Chợ Lớn, goods from Chinese merchants were scattered in the streets. Tens of thousands of people were killed. The town was rebuilt. High embankment were erected and it was renamed Tai-Ngon (embankment).

Nguyễn Ánh returned to Giồng Lữ, defeated Admiral Nguyễn Học of the Tây Sơn and captured eighty battleships. Ánh then began a campaign to reclaim southern Vietnam, but Nguyễn Huệ deployed a naval force to the river and destroyed his navy. Ánh again escaped with his followers to Hậu Giang. Cambodia later cooperated with the Tây Sơn to destroy Ánh's force and made him retreat to Rạch Giá, then to Hà Tiên and Phú Quốc.

==== Nguyễn–Siam alliance ====
Following consecutive losses to the Tây Sơn, Ánh sent his general Châu Văn Tiếp to Siam to request military assistance. Siam, under Chakri rule, wanted to conquer Cambodia and southern Vietnam. King Rama I agreed to ally with the Nguyễn lord and intervene militarily in Vietnam. Châu Văn Tiếp sent a secret letter to Ánh about the alliance. After meeting with Siamese generals at Cà Mau, Ánh, thirty officials and some troops visited Bangkok to meet Rama I in May 1784. The governor of Gia Định Province, Nguyễn Văn Thành, advised Ánh against foreign assistance.

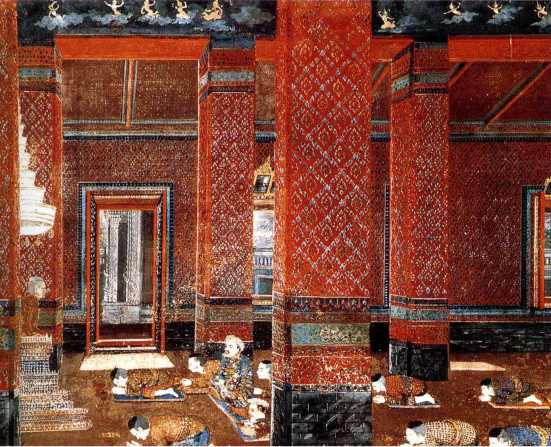
Nguyễn Ánh (sitting, 2nd row) in audience with King Rama I in Phra Thinang Amarin Winitchai throne hall, Bangkok, 1782.

Rama I, fearing the growing influence of the Tây Sơn dynasty in Cambodia and Laos, decided to dispatch his army against it. In Bangkok, Ánh began to recruit Vietnamese refugees in Siam to join his army (which totaled over 9,000). He returned to Vietnam and prepared his forces for the Tây Sơn campaign in June 1784, after which he captured Gia Định. Rama I nominated his nephew, Chiêu Tăng, as admiral the following month. The admiral led Siamese forces including 20,000 marine troops and 300 warships from the Gulf of Siam to Kiên Giang Province. In addition, more than 30,000 Siamese infantry troops crossed the Cambodian border to An Giang Province. On 25 November 1784, Admiral Châu Văn Tiếp died in battle against the Tây Sơn in Mang Thít District, Vĩnh Long Province. The alliance was largely victorious from July through November, and the Tây Sơn army retreated north. However, Emperor Nguyễn Huệ halted the retreat and counter-attacked the Siamese forces in December. In the decisive battle of Rạch Gầm–Xoài Mút, more than 20,000 Siamese soldiers died and the remainder retreated to Siam.

Ánh, disillusioned with Siam, escaped to Thổ Chu Island in April 1785 and then to Ko Kut Island in Thailand. The Siamese army escorted him back to Bangkok, and he was briefly exiled in Thailand.

==== French assistance ====
The war between the Nguyễn lord and the Tây Sơn dynasty forced Ánh to find more allies. His relationship with de Behaine improved, and support for an alliance with France increased. Before the request for Siamese military assistance, de Behaine was in Chanthaburi and Ánh asked him to come to Phú Quốc Island. Ánh asked him to contact King Louis XVI of France for assistance; de Behaine agreed to coordinate an alliance between France and Vietnam, and Ánh gave him a letter to present at the French court. Ánh's oldest son, Nguyễn Phúc Cảnh, was chosen to accompany de Behaine. Due to inclement weather, the voyage was postponed until December 1784. The group departed from Phú Quốc Island for Malacca and thence to Pondicherry, and Ánh moved his family to Bangkok. The group arrived in Lorient in February 1787, and Louis XVI agreed to meet them in May.

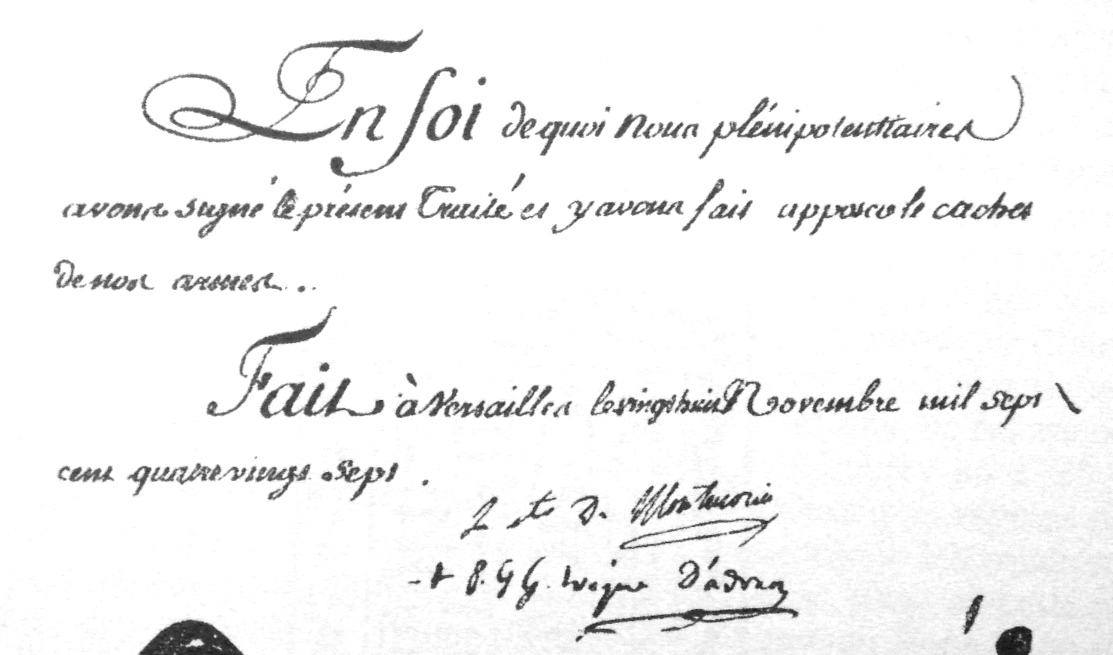
Signatures on the 1787 Treaty of Versailles

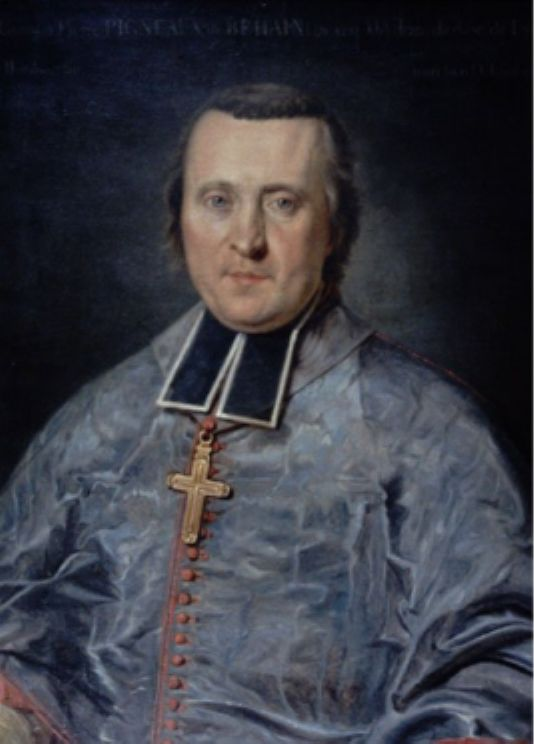
Pigneau de Behaine, the French priest who recruited armies for Nguyễn Ánh during Ánh's war against the Tây Sơn

On 28 November 1787, Behaine signed the Treaty of Versailles with French Minister of Foreign Affairs Armand Marc at the Palace of Versailles on behalf of Nguyễn Ánh. The treaty stipulated that France provide four frigates, 1,200 infantry troops, 200 artillery, 250 cafres (African soldiers), and other equipment. Nguyễn Ánh ceded the Đà Nẵng estuary and Côn Sơn Island to France. The French were allowed to trade freely and control foreign trade in Vietnam. Vietnam had to build one ship per year which was similar to the French ship which brought aid and gave it to France. Vietnam was obligated to supply food and other aid to France when the French were at war with other East Asian nations.

On 27 December 1787, Pigneau de Behaine and Nguyễn Phúc Cảnh left France for Pondicherry to wait for the military support promised by the treaty. However, due to the French Revolution and the abolition of the French monarchy, the treaty was never executed. Thomas Conway, who was responsible for French assistance, refused to provide it. Although the treaty was not implemented, de Behaine recruited French businessman who intended to trade in Vietnam and raised funds to assist Nguyễn Ánh. He spent fifteen thousand francs of his own money to purchase guns and warships. Cảnh and de Behaine returned to Gia Định in 1788 (after Nguyễn Ánh had recaptured it), followed by a ship with the war materiel. Frenchmen who were recruited included Jean-Baptiste Chaigneau, Philippe Vannier, Olivier de Puymanel, and Jean-Marie Dayot. A total of twenty people joined Ánh's army. The French purchased and supplied equipment and weaponry, reinforcing the defense of Gia Định, Vĩnh Long, Châu Đốc, Hà Tiên, Biên Hòa, Bà Rịa and training Ánh's artillery and infantry according to the European model.

==== Qing China–Lê alliance against Tây Sơn ====
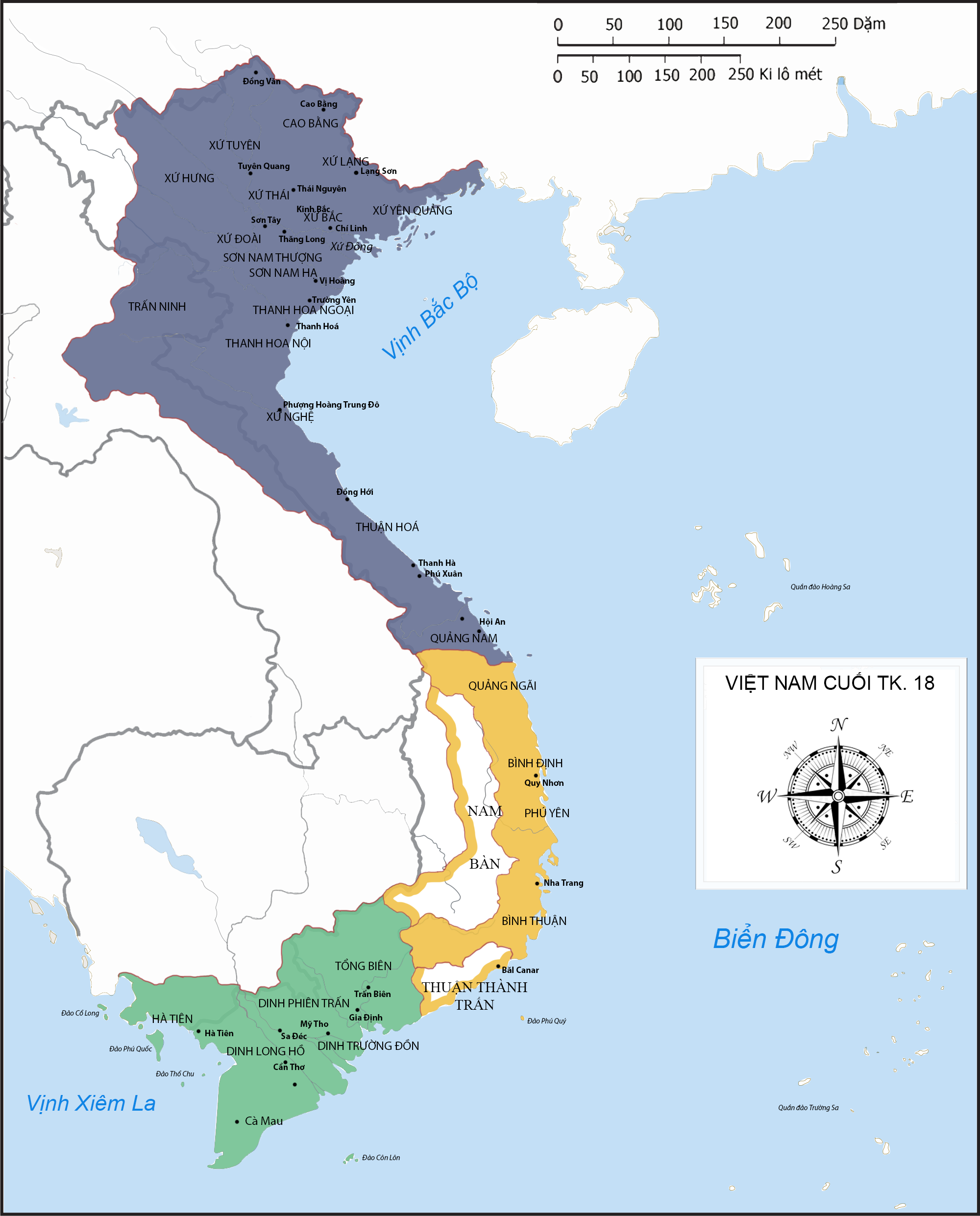
Vietnam at the end of the 18th century. The Tây Sơn army, including Nguyễn Huệ, ruled the north (purple); Nguyễn Nhạc the middle (yellow), and Nguyễn Ánh the south (green).

In 1786, Nguyễn Huệ led the army against the Trịnh lords; Trịnh Khải escaped to the north but got captured by the local people. He then committed suicide. After the Tây Sơn army returned to Quy Nhơn, subjects of the Trịnh lord restored Trịnh Bồng (son of Trịnh Giang) as the next lord. Lê Chiêu Thống, emperor of the Lê dynasty, wanted to regain power from the Trịnh. He summoned Nguyễn Hữu Chỉnh, governor of Nghệ An, to attack the Trịnh lord at the Imperial Citadel of Thăng Long. Trịnh Bồng surrendered to the Lê and became a monk. Nguyễn Hữu Chỉnh wanted to unify the country under Lê rule, and began to prepare the army to march south and attack the Tây Sơn. Huệ led the army, killed Nguyễn Hữu Chỉnh, and captured the later Lê capital. The Lê imperial family were exiled to China, and the later Lê dynasty collapsed.

At that time, Nguyễn Huệ's influence became stronger in northern Vietnam; this made Emperor Nguyễn Nhạc of the Tây Sơn dynasty suspect Huệ's loyalty. The relationship between the brothers became tense, eventually leading to battle. Huệ had his army surround Nhạc's capital, at Quy Nhơn citadel, in 1787. Nhạc begged Huệ not to kill him, and they reconciled. In 1788, Lê emperor Lê Chiêu Thống fled to China and asked for military assistance. The Qianlong Emperor of the Qing ordered Sun Shiyi to lead the military campaign into Vietnam. The campaign failed, and later on, the Qing recognized the Tây Sơn as the legitimate dynasty in Vietnam. However, with the death of Huệ (1792), the Tây Sơn dynasty began to weaken.

==== Franco–Nguyễn alliance against Tây Sơn ====
===== Nguyễn Ánh's counter-attack =====
Ánh began to reorganize a strong armed force in Siam. He left Siam (after thanking King Rama I), and returned to Vietnam. During the 1787 war between Nguyễn Huệ and Nguyễn Nhạc in northern Vietnam, Ánh recaptured the southern Vietnamese capital of Gia Định. Southern Vietnam had been ruled by the Nguyễns and they remained popular, especially with the ethnic Chinese. Nguyễn Lữ, the youngest brother of Tây Sơn (who ruled southern Vietnam), could not defend the citadel and retreated to Quy Nhơn. The citadel of Gia Định was seized by the Nguyễn lords.
In 1788 de Behaine and Ánh's son, Prince Cảnh, arrived in Gia Định with modern war equipment and more than twenty Frenchmen who wanted to join the army. The force was trained and strengthened with French assistance.

===== Defeat of the Tây Sơn =====
After the fall of the citadel at Gia Định, Nguyễn Huệ prepared an expedition to reclaim it before his death on 16 September 1792. His young son, Nguyễn Quang Toản, succeeded him as emperor of the Tây Sơn and was a poor leader. In 1793, Nguyễn Ánh began a campaign against Quang Toản. Due to conflict between officials of the Tây Sơn court, Quang Toản lost battle after battle. In 1797, Ánh and Nguyễn Phúc Cảnh attacked Qui Nhơn (then in Phú Yên Province) in the Battle of Thị Nại. They were victorious, capturing a large amount of Tây Sơn equipment. Quang Toản became unpopular due to his murders of generals and officials, leading to a decline in the army. In 1799, Ánh captured the citadel of Quy Nhơn. He seized the capital (Phú Xuân) on 3 May 1801, and Quang Toản retreated north. On 20 July 1802, Ánh captured Hanoi and end the Tây Sơn dynasty, all of the members of the Tây Sơn was captured. Ánh then executed all the members of the Tây Sơn dynasty that year.

=== Imperial rule (1802–1883) ===
==== Overview ====
In Vietnamese historiography, the independent period is referred to as the Nhà Nguyễn thời độc lập period. During this period the Nguyễn dynasty's territories comprised the present-day territories of Vietnam and parts of modern Cambodia and Laos, bordering Siam to the west and Manchu Qing dynasty to the north. The ruling Nguyễn emperors established and ran the first well-defined imperial administrative and bureaucratic system of Vietnam and annexed Cambodia and Champa into its territories in the 1830s. Together with Chakri Siam and Konbaung Burma, it was one among three major Southeast Asian powers at the time. The emperor Gia Long was relatively friendly toward Western powers and Christianity. After his reign of Minh Mạng brought a new approach, he ruled for 21 years from 1820 to 1841, as a conservative and Confucian ruler; introducing a policy of isolationism which kept the country from the rest of the world for nearly 40 years until the French invasion in 1858. Minh Mạng tightened control over Catholicism, Muslim, and ethnic minorities, resulting in more than two hundred rebellions across the country during his twenty-one-year reign. He also further expanded Vietnamese imperialism in modern-day Laos and Cambodia.

Minh Mạng's successors, Thiệu Trị (r. 1841–1847) and Tự Đức (r. 1847–1883) would be assailed by serious problems that ultimately decimated the Vietnamese state. In the late 1840s, Vietnam was struck by the global cholera pandemic that killed roughly 8% of the country's population, while the countries isolationist policies damaged the economy. France and Spain declared war on Vietnam in September 1858. Faced with these industrialised powers, the hermit Nguyễn dynasty and its military crumbled, the alliance capturing Saigon in early 1859. A series of unequal treaties followed with first the 1862 Treaty of Saigon, and then the 1863 Treaty of Huế which gave France access to Vietnamese ports and increased control of its foreign affairs. The Treaty of Saigon (1874) concluded the French annexation of Cochinchina that had begun in 1862.

The last independent Nguyễn emperor of note was Tự Đức. Upon his death, a succession crisis followed, as the regent Tôn Thất Thuyết orchestrated the murders of three emperors in a year. This presented an opportunity to the French. The Huế court was forced to sign the Harmand Convention in September 1883, which formalised the handover of Tonkin to the French administration. After the Treaty of Patenôtre was signed in 1884, France finished its annexation and partitioning of Vietnam into three constituent protectorates of French Indochina, and turned the Nguyễn into a vassal monarchy. Finally, the Treaty of Tientsin (1885) between the Chinese Empire and the French Republic was signed on 9 June 1885 recognizing French dominion over Vietnam. All emperors after Đồng Khánh were chosen by the French, and only ruled symbolically.

==== Gia Long period ====
Nguyễn Phúc Ánh united Vietnam after a three-hundred-year division of the country. He celebrated his coronation at Huế on 1 June 1802 and proclaimed himself emperor (Vietnamese: Hoàng Đế), with the era name Gia Long (嘉隆). This title emphasized his rule from "Gia" Định region (modern-day Saigon) in the far south to Thăng "Long" (modern-day Hanoi) in the north. Gia Long prioritized the nation's defense and worked to avoid another civil war. He replaced the feudal system with a reformist Doctrine of the Mean, based on Confucianism. The Nguyen dynasty was founded as a tributary state of the Qing Empire, with Gia Long receiving an imperial pardon and recognition as the ruler of Vietnam from the Jiaqing Emperor for recognizing Chinese suzerainty. The envoys sent to China to acquire this recognition cited the ancient kingdom of Nanyue (Vietnamese: Nam Việt) to Emperor Jiaqing as the countries name, this displeased the emperor who was disconcerted by such pretentions, and Nguyễn Phúc Ánh had to officially rename his kingdom as Vietnam the next year to satisfy the emperor. The country was officially known as 'The (Great) Vietnamese state' (Vietnamese: Đại Việt Nam quốc),

Gia Long asserted that he was reviving the bureaucratic state that was built by emperor Lê Thánh Tông during the fifteenth-century golden age (1470–1497), as such he adopted a Confucian-bureaucratic government model, and sought unification with northern literati. To ensure stability over the unified kingdom, he placed two of his most loyal and Confucian-educated advisors, Nguyễn Văn Thành and Lê Văn Duyệt as viceroys of Hanoi and Saigon. From 1780 to 1820, roughly 300 Frenchmen served Gia Long's court as officials. Seeing the French influence in Vietnam with alarm, the British Empire sent two envoys to Gia Long in 1803 and 1804 to convince him to abandon his friendship with the French. In 1808, a British fleet led by William O'Bryen Drury mounted an attack on the Red River Delta, but was soon driven back by the Vietnamese navy and suffered several losses. After the Napoleonic War and Gia Long's death, the British Empire renewed relations with Vietnam in 1822. During his reign, a system of roads connecting Hanoi, Hue, and Saigon with postal stations and inns was established, several canals connecting the Mekong River to the Gulf of Siam were constructed and finished. In 1812, Gia Long issued the Gia Long Code, which was instituted based on the Ch'ing Code of China, replaced the previous Thánh Tông's 1480 Code. In 1811, a coup d'état broke out in the Kingdom of Cambodia, a Vietnamese tributary state, forcing the pro-Vietnamese King Ang Chan II to seek support from Vietnam. Gia Long sent 13,000 men to Cambodia, successfully restoring his vassal to his throne, and beginning a more formal occupation of the country for the next 30 years, while Siam seized northern Cambodia in 1814.

Gia Long died in 1819 and was succeeded by his fourth son, Nguyễn Phúc Đảm, who soon became known as Emperor Minh Mạng (r. 1820–1841) of Vietnam.

==== Rise and expansion under Minh Mạng ====
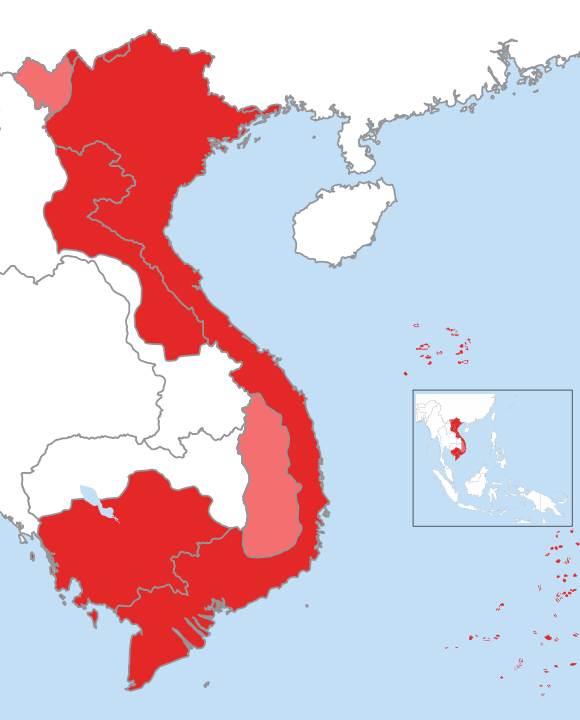
Đại Nam (Nguyễn dynasty) under the reign of Emperor Minh Mạng (1820-1839).

Minh Mạng was the younger brother of prince Nguyễn Phúc Cảnh and fourth son of Emperor Gia Long. Educated in Confucian principles from youth, Minh Mạng became the Emperor of Vietnam in 1820, during a deadly cholera outbreak that ravaged and killed 200,000 people across the country. His reign mainly focused on centralizing and stabilizing the state, by abolishing the Viceroy system and implementing a new full bureaucracy-provincial-based administration. He also halted diplomacy with Europe, and cracked down on religious minorities.

Minh Mạng shunned relations with the European powers. By 1824, after the death of Jean Marie Despiau, no Western advisors who had served Gia Long remained in Minh Mạng's court. The last French consul of Vietnam, Eugene Chaigneau, was never able to obtain audience with Minh Mạng. After he left, France ceased attempts at contact. In the next year he launched an anti-Catholicism propaganda campaign, denouncing the religion as "vicious" and full of "false teaching." In 1832 Minh Mạng turned the Cham Principality of Thuận Thành into a Vietnamese province, the final conquest in a long history of colonial conflict between Cham and Vietnam. He coercively fed lizard and pork to Cham Muslims and beef to Cham Hindus in violation of their religions to forcibly assimilate them to Vietnamese culture. The first Cham revolt for independence took place in 1833–1834 when Katip Sumat, a Cham mullah who had just returned to Vietnam from Mecca declared a holy war (jihad) against the Vietnamese emperor. The rebellion failed to gain the support of the Cham elite and was quickly suppressed by the Vietnamese military. A second revolt began the following year, led by a Muslim clergy named Ja Thak with support from the old Cham royalty, highland people, and Vietnamese dissents. Minh Mạng mercilessly crushed the Ja Thak rebellion and executed the last Cham ruler Po Phaok The in early 1835.

In 1833, as Minh Mạng had been trying to take firm control over the six southern provinces, a large rebellion led by Lê Văn Khôi (an adopted son of the Saigon viceroy Lê Văn Duyệt) broke out in Saigon, attempting to place Minh Mang's brother Prince Cảnh on the throne. The rebellion lasted for two years, gathering much support from Vietnamese Catholics, Khmers, Chinese merchants in Saigon, and even the Siamese ruler Rama III until it was crushed by the government forces in 1835. In January, he issued the first country-wide prohibition of Catholicism, and began persecuting Christians. 130 Christian missionaries, priests and church leaders were executed, dozens of churches were burned and destroyed.

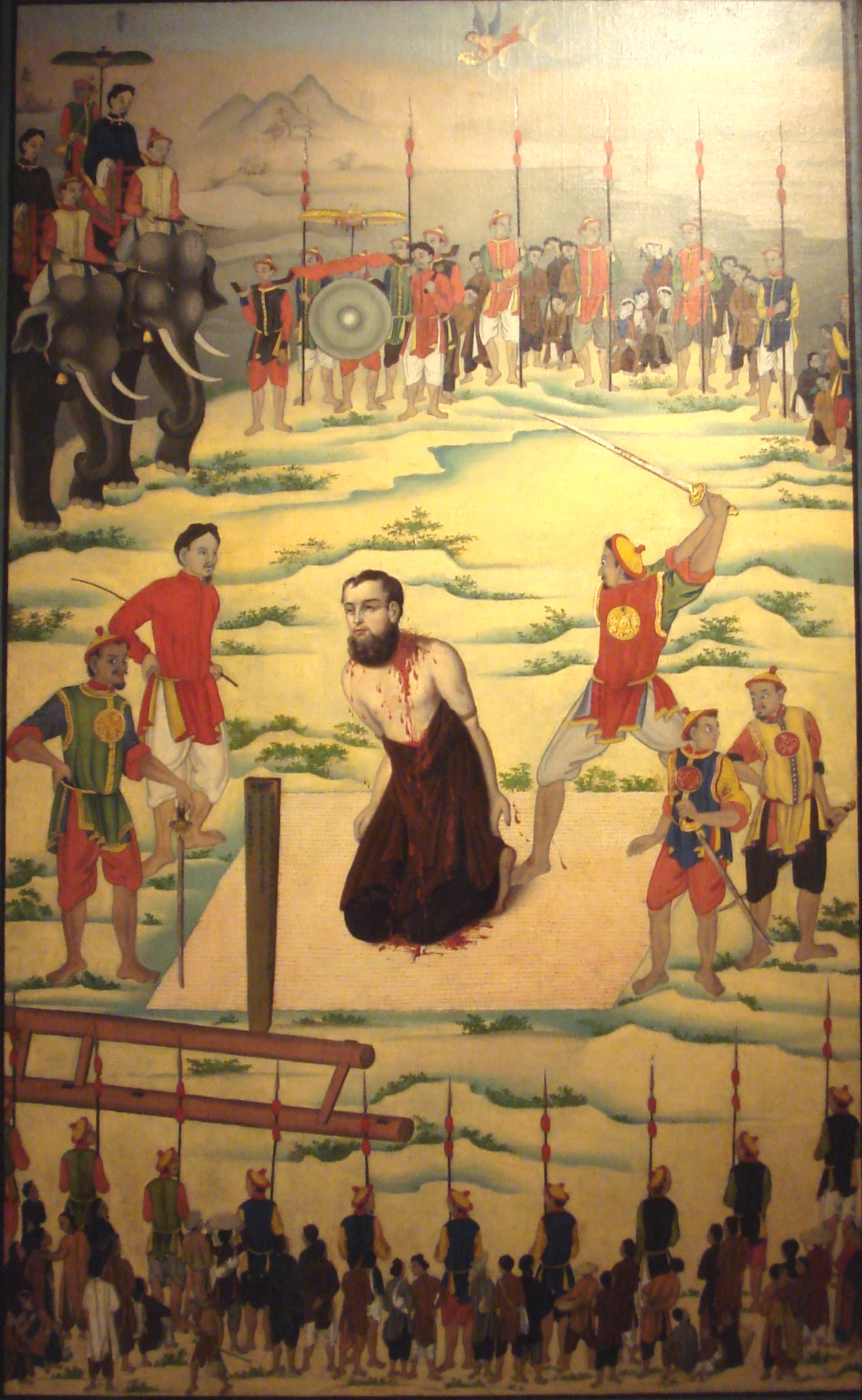
Execution of French missionary Pierre Borie, 1838.

==== War with Siam and invasion of Cambodia ====
Minh Mạng also expanded his empire westward, putting central and southern Laos under Cam Lộ Province, and collided with his father's former ally – Siam, in Vientiane and Cambodia. He backed the revolt of Laotian king Anouvong of Vientiane against the Siamese, and seized Xam Neua and Savannakhet in 1827.

In 1834, the Vietnamese Crown fully annexed Cambodia and renamed it to Tây Thành Province. Minh Mạng placed the general Trương Minh Giảng as the governor of the Cambodian province, expanding his forcible religious assimilation to the new territory. King Ang Chan II of Cambodia died in the next year and Ming Mang installed Chan's daughter Ang Mey as Commandery Princess of Cambodia. Cambodian officials were required to wear Vietnamese-style clothing, and govern in Vietnamese style. However the Vietnamese rule over Cambodia did not last long and proved draining to Vietnam's economy to maintain. Minh Mạng died in 1841, while a Khmer uprising was in progress with Siamese support, putting an end to the Tây Thành province and Vietnamese control of Cambodia.

==== Decline of the Nguyễn dynasty ====
Over the next forty years, Vietnam was ruled by two further independent emperors Thiệu Trị (r. 1841–1847) and Tự Đức (r. 1848–1883). Thiệu Trị or Prince Miên Tông, was the eldest son of Emperor Minh Mạng. His six-year reign showed a significant decrease in Catholic persecution. With the population growing fast from 6 million in the 1820s to 10 million in 1850, the attempts at agricultural self sufficiency were proving unworkable. Between 1802 and 1862, the court had faced 405 minor and large revolts of peasants, political dissents, ethnic minorities, Lê loyalists (people that were loyal to the old Lê Duy dynasty) across the country, this made responding to the challenge of European colonisers significantly more challenging.

In 1845, the American warship USS Constitution landed in Đà Nẵng, taking all local officials hostage with the demands that Thiệu Trị free imprisoned French bishop Dominique Lefèbvre. In 1847, Thiệu Trị had made peace with Siam, but the imprisonment of Dominique Lefebvre offered an excuse for French and British aggression. In April the French navy attacked the Vietnamese and sank many Vietnamese ships in Đà Nẵng, demanding the release of Lefèbvre. Angered by the incident, Thiệu Trị ordered all European documents in his palace to be smashed, and all Europeans caught on Vietnamese land were to be immediately executed. In autumn, two British warships of Sir John Davis arrived in Đà Nẵng and attempted to force a commercial treaty on Vietnam, but the emperor refused. He died a few days later of apoplexy.

Tự Đức, or Prince Hồng Nhậm was Thiệu Trị's youngest son, well-educated in Confucian learning, he was crowned by minister and co-regent Trương Đăng Quế. Prince Hồng Bảo-the elder brother of Tự Đức, the primogeniture heir rebelled against Tự Đức on the day of his accession. This coup failed but he was spared execution on the intervention of Từ Dụ, with his sentence being reduced to life imprisonment. Aware of the rise of Western influences in Asia, Tự Đức confirmed his grandfathers isolationist policy towards the European powers, prohibiting embassies, forbidding trade and contact with foreigners and renewing the persecution of Catholics his grandfather had orchestrated. During Tự Đức's first twelve years, Vietnamese Catholics faced harsh persecution with 27 European missionaries, 300 Vietnamese priests and bishops, and 30,000 Vietnamese Christians executed and crucified from 1848 to 1860.

In the late 1840s, another cholera outbreak hit Vietnam, having travelled from India. The epidemic quickly spread out of control and killed 800,000 people (8–10% of Vietnam's 1847 population) across the Empire. Locusts plagued northern Vietnam in 1854, and a major rebellion in the following year damaged much of the Tonkin countryside. These various crises weakened the empire's control over Tonkin considerably.

In the 1850–70s, a new class of liberal intellectuals emerged in the court as persecution relaxed, many of them Catholics who had studied abroad in Europe, most notably Nguyễn Trường Tộ, who urged the emperor to reform and transform the Empire following the Western model and open Vietnam to the west. Despite their efforts the conservative Confucian bureaucrats and Tự Đức himself had a literal interest in such reforms. The economy remained largely agricultural, with 95% of the population living in rural areas, only mining offered potential to the modernist's dreams of a western-style state.

==== French conquest ====
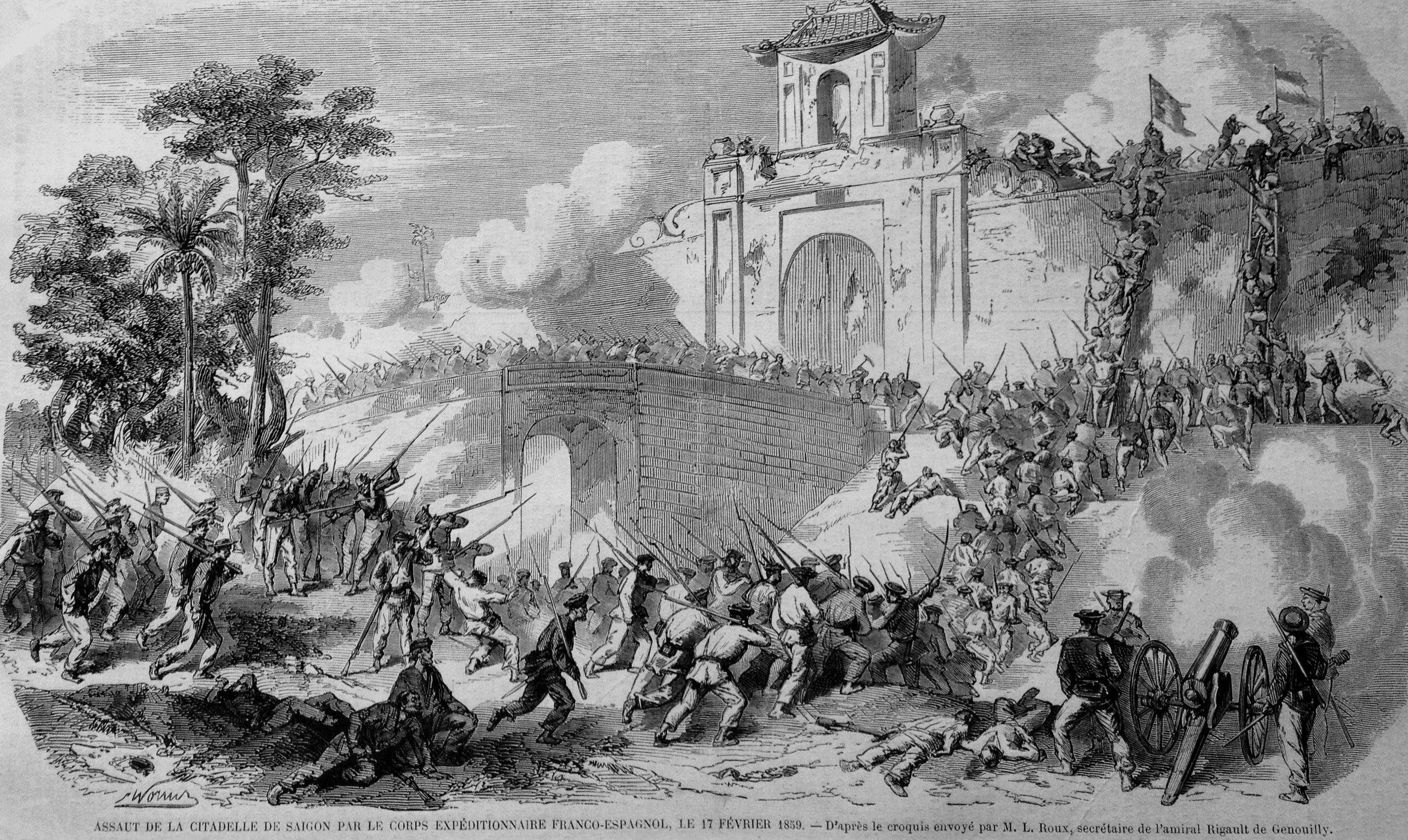
The Alliance (France-Spain) army capture of the Citadel of Saigon in 1859.

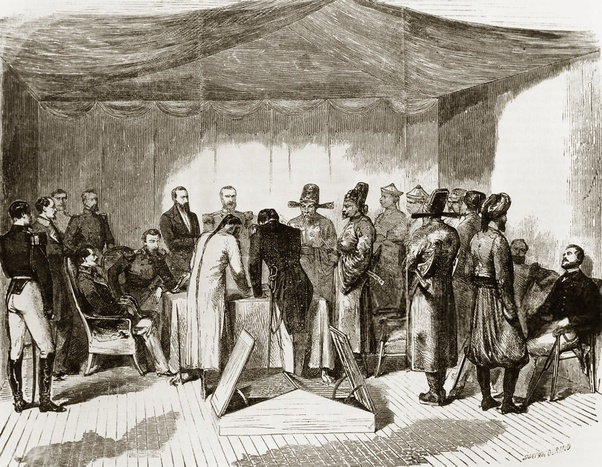
Treaty of Saigon (1862).

In September 1858, Napoleon III orchestrated a Franco-Spanish army bombardment and invaded Đà Nẵng to protest against the executions of two Spanish Dominican missionaries. Seven months later, they sailed to the south to attack Saigon and the rich Mekong Delta. The Alliance troops held Saigon for two years, while a rebellion of Lê loyalists led by Catholic bishop Pedro Tạ Văn Phụng, who proclaimed himself to be a Lê prince, broke out in the north and escalated. Alongside the pretext of avenging the death of the missionaries the French invasion was designed to prove to Europe that France wasn't a second-rate power, and 'civilize' the area. In February 1861, French reinforcement and 70 warships led by General Vassoigne arrived and overwhelmed the Vietnamese strongholds. Facing the Alliance invasion and internal rebellion, Tự Đức chose to cede three Southern provinces to France to deal with the coinciding rebellion.

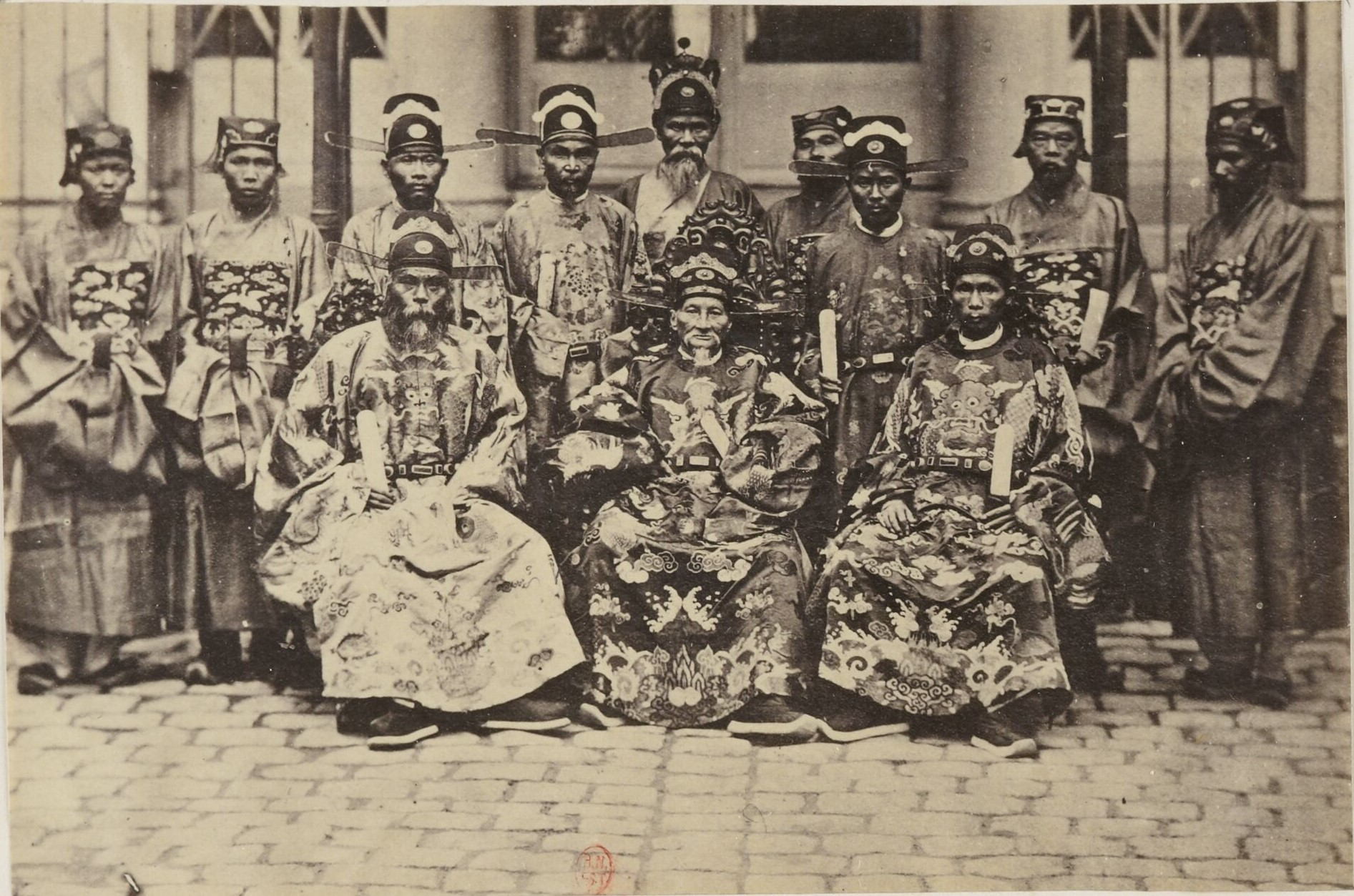
Vietnamese delegation to France on 20 September 1863 for peace treaty negotiation. 1st row from left to right: Ngụy Khác Đản, Phan Thanh Giản Head of legation (middle) and Phạm Phú Thứ.

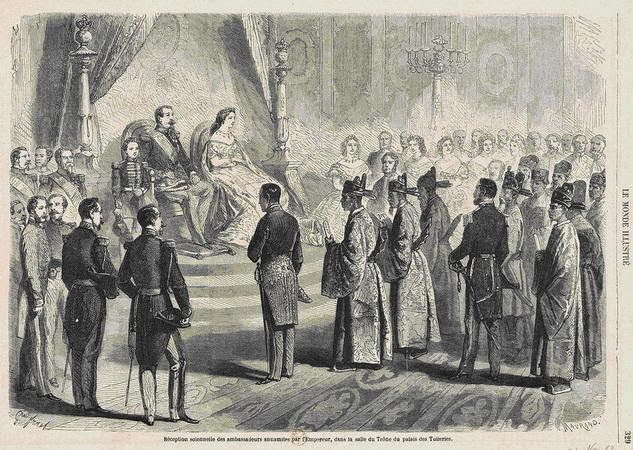
Vietnamese mission to Napoleon III's court at the Tuileries Palace (1863).

In June 1862, the Treaty of Saigon was signed, resulting in Vietnam losing three southern provinces; Gia Định, Mỹ Tho, Biên Hòa which became the basis of French Cochinchina. In the Treaty of Huế (1863) the island of Poulo Condoræ would allow Catholicism, three ports would be open to French trade, and the sea opened to allow French expansion into Kampuchea. and war reparations were required to be sent to France. Despite the religious elements of this treaty, France would not intervene in the Christian revolt in Northern Vietnam, even with their missionaries urging them to. To the Queen dowager, Từ Dụ, the court, and the people, the 1862 treaty was a national humiliation. Tự Đức once again sent a mission to the French Emperor Napoleon III, in which he called to revise the 1862 treaty. In July 1864, another draft treaty was signed. France returned the three provinces to Vietnam, but still held control over three important cities Saigon, Mỹ Tho, and Thủ Dầu Một. In 1866, France convinced Tự Đức to hand over the southern provinces of Vĩnh Long, Hà Tiên, and Châu Đốc. Phan Thanh Giản, the governor of the three provinces immediately resigned. Without resistance, in 1867, the French annexed the provinces and turned their attention to the northern provinces.

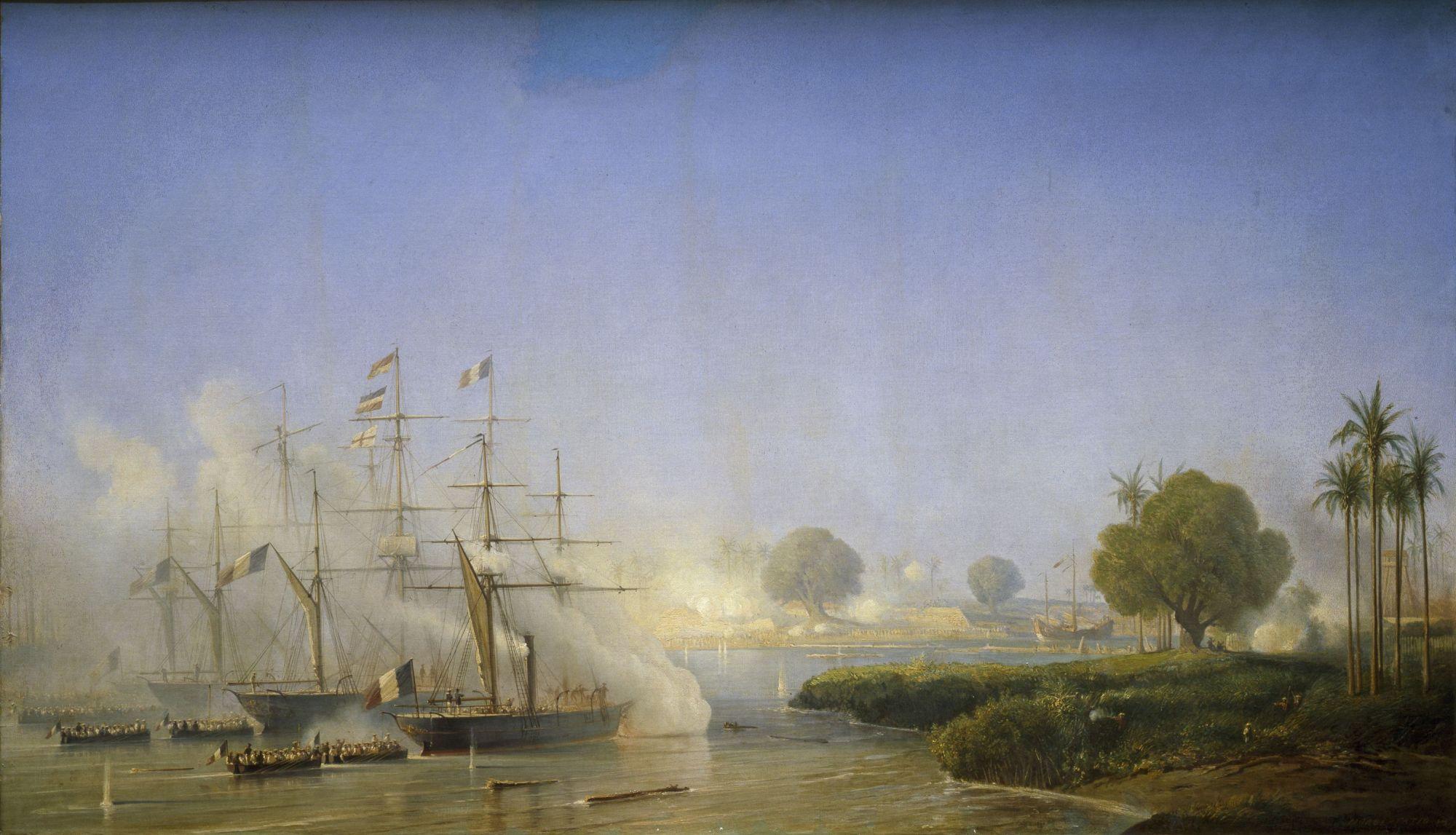
Capture of Saigon by Charles Rigault de Genouilly on 17 February 1859, painted by Antoine Morel-Fatio.

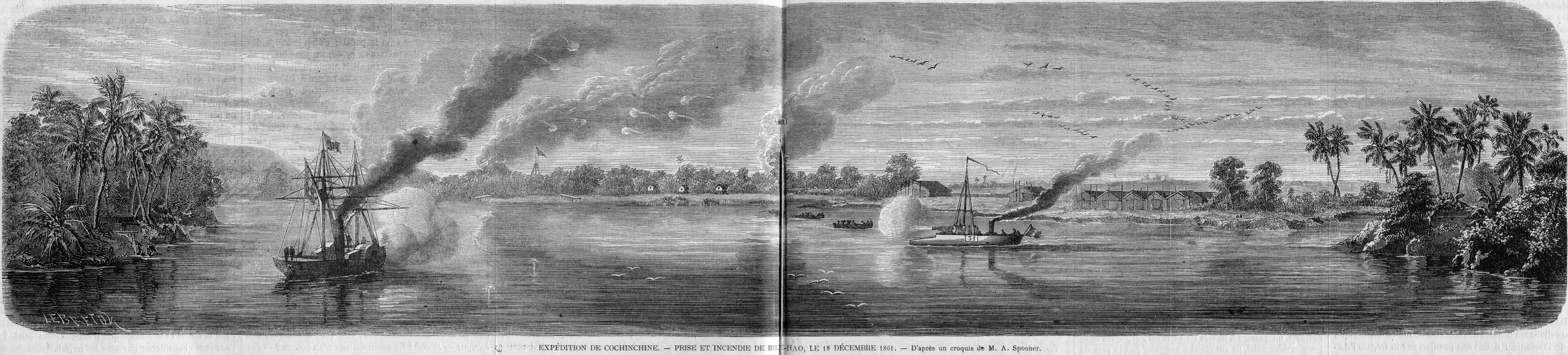
Bombardment of Biên Hòa (16 December 1861).

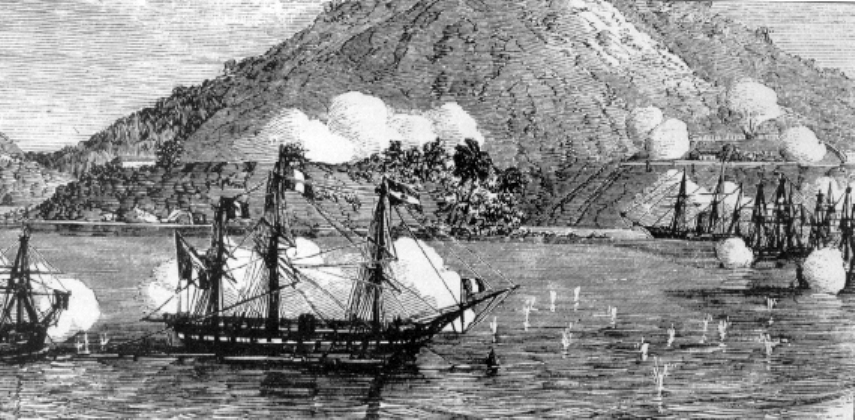
French warships Siege of Tourane (Đà Nẵng), September 1858.

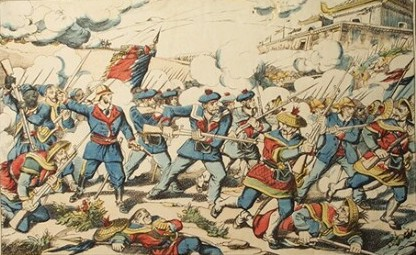
Capture of Bắc Ninh during the Tonkin campaign.

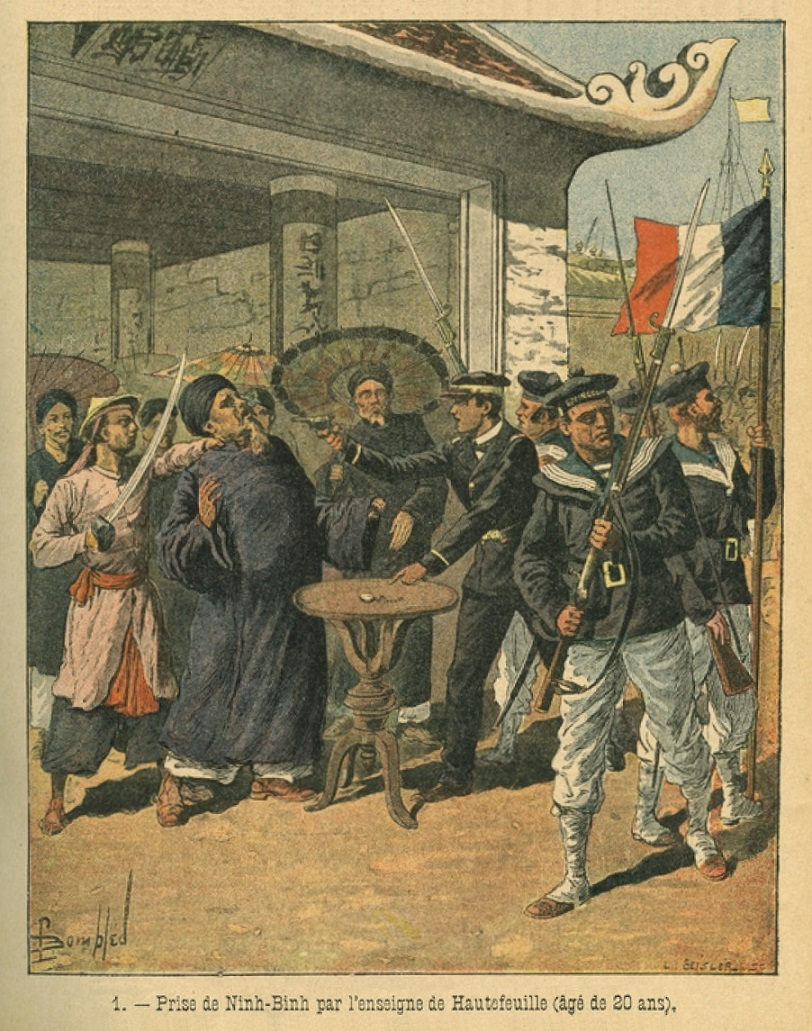
The capture of Ninh Bình by Aspirant Hautefeuille and his sailors

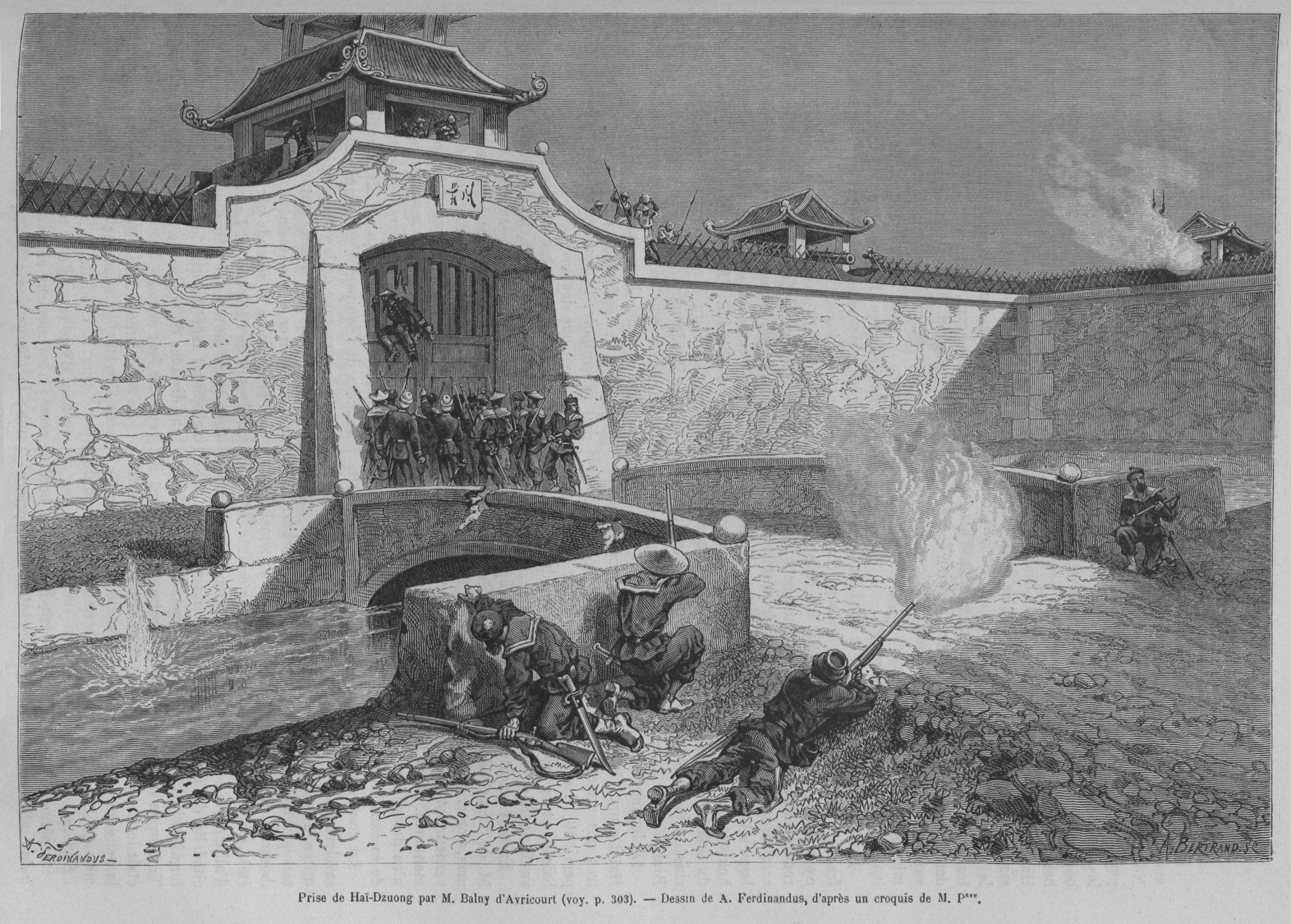
French attack on the citadel of Hải Dương.

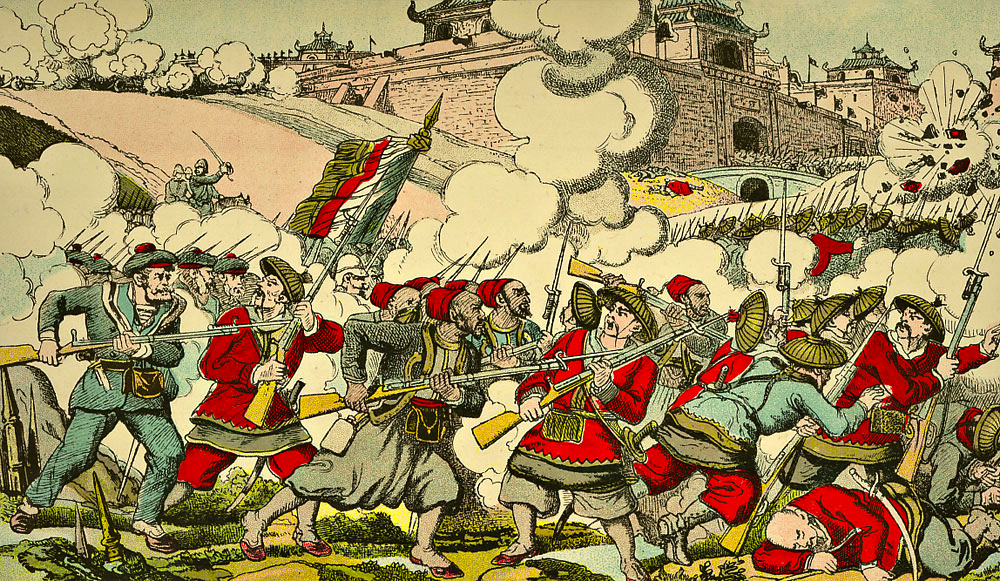
Turcos and fusiliers-marins at Bắc Ninh, 12 March 1884

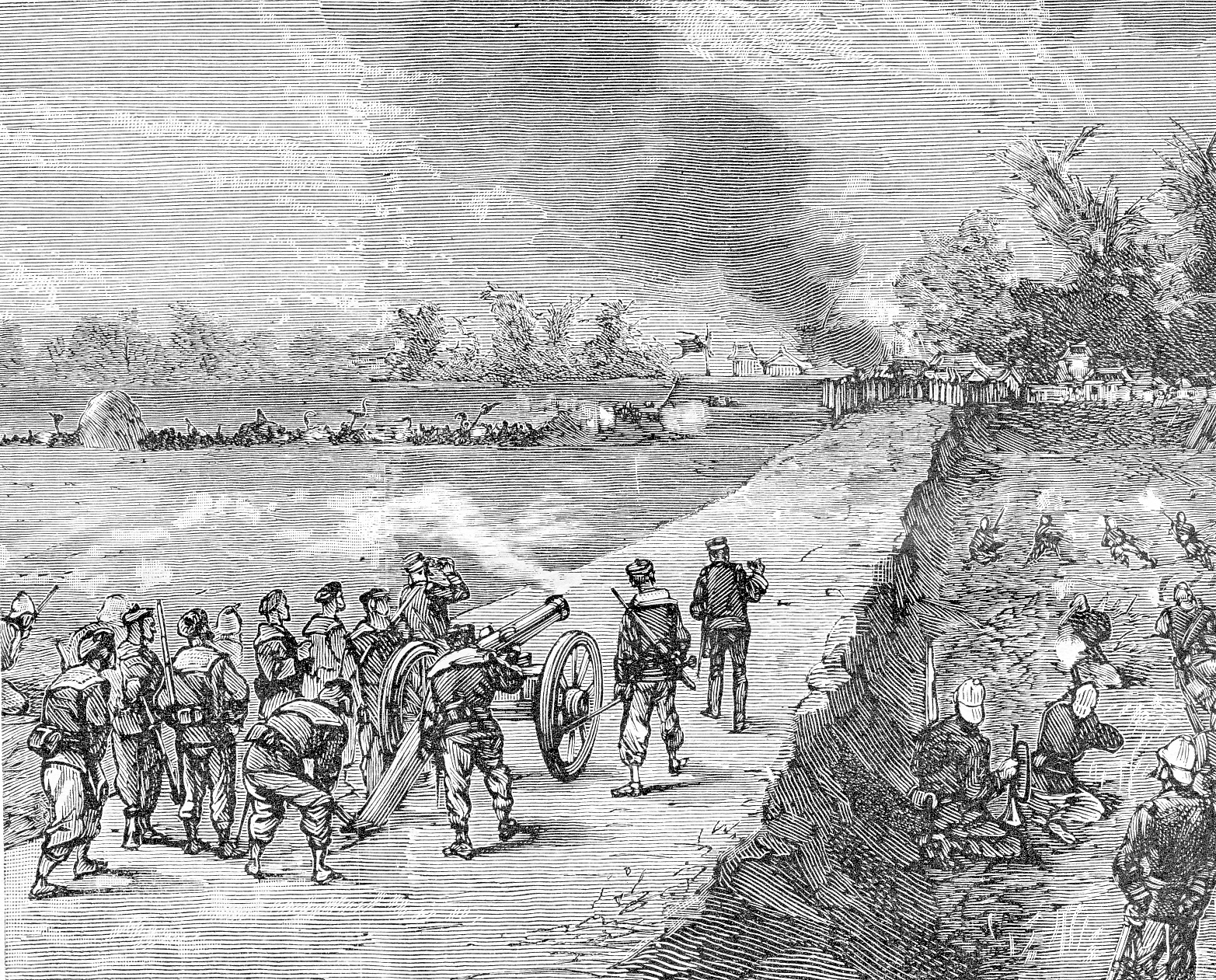
A French naval gun, deployed on a dyke, supports a marine infantry attack on the Vietnamese positions at Gia Cuc (Gia Quất)

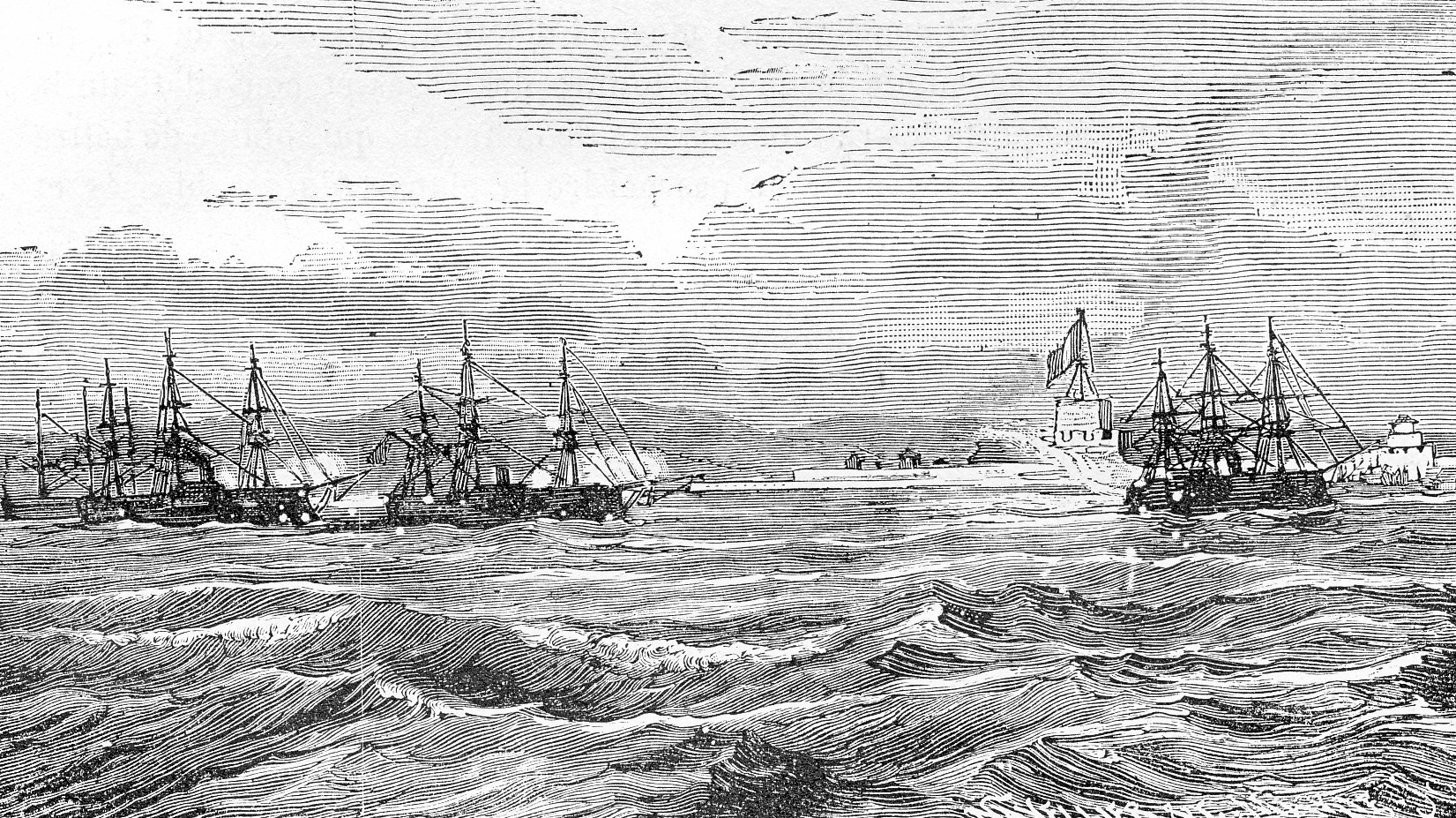
French warships deployed off the Thuận An forts, 18 August 1883

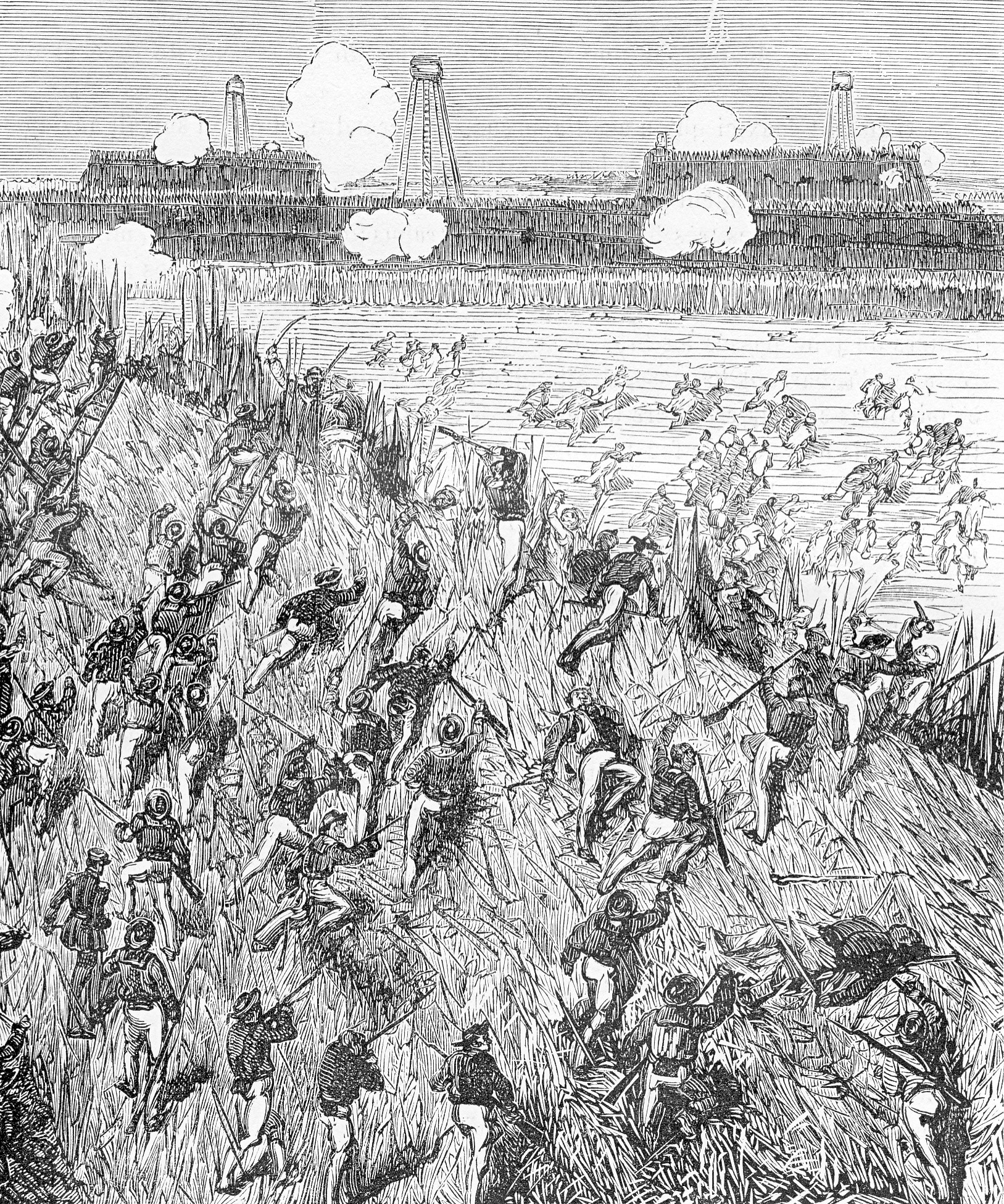
The attack on the Thuận An forts, 20 August 1883

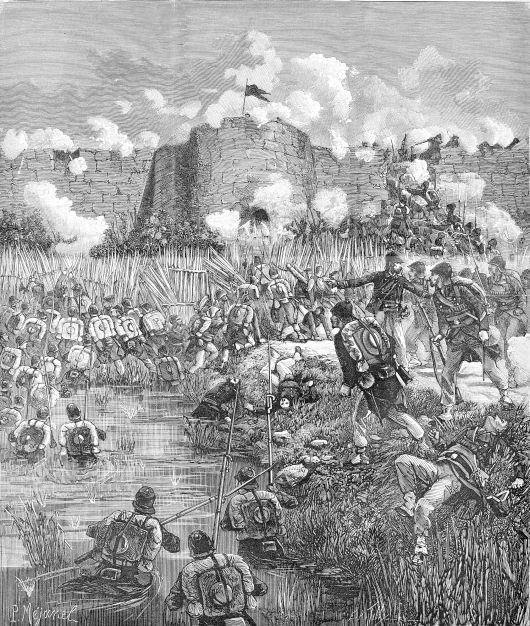
The capture of Sơn Tây, 16 December 1883

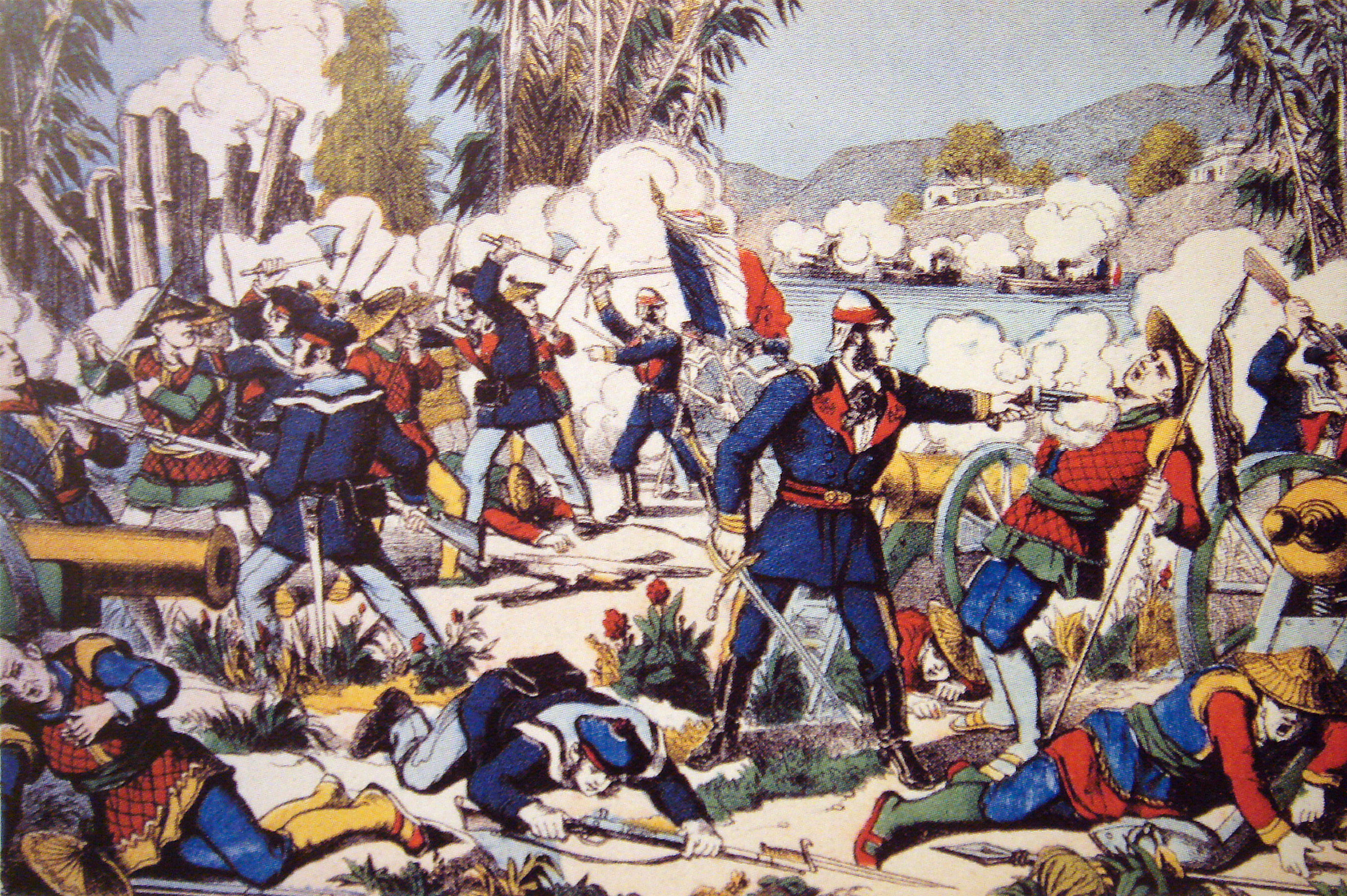
Capture of Nam Định, 19 July 1883.

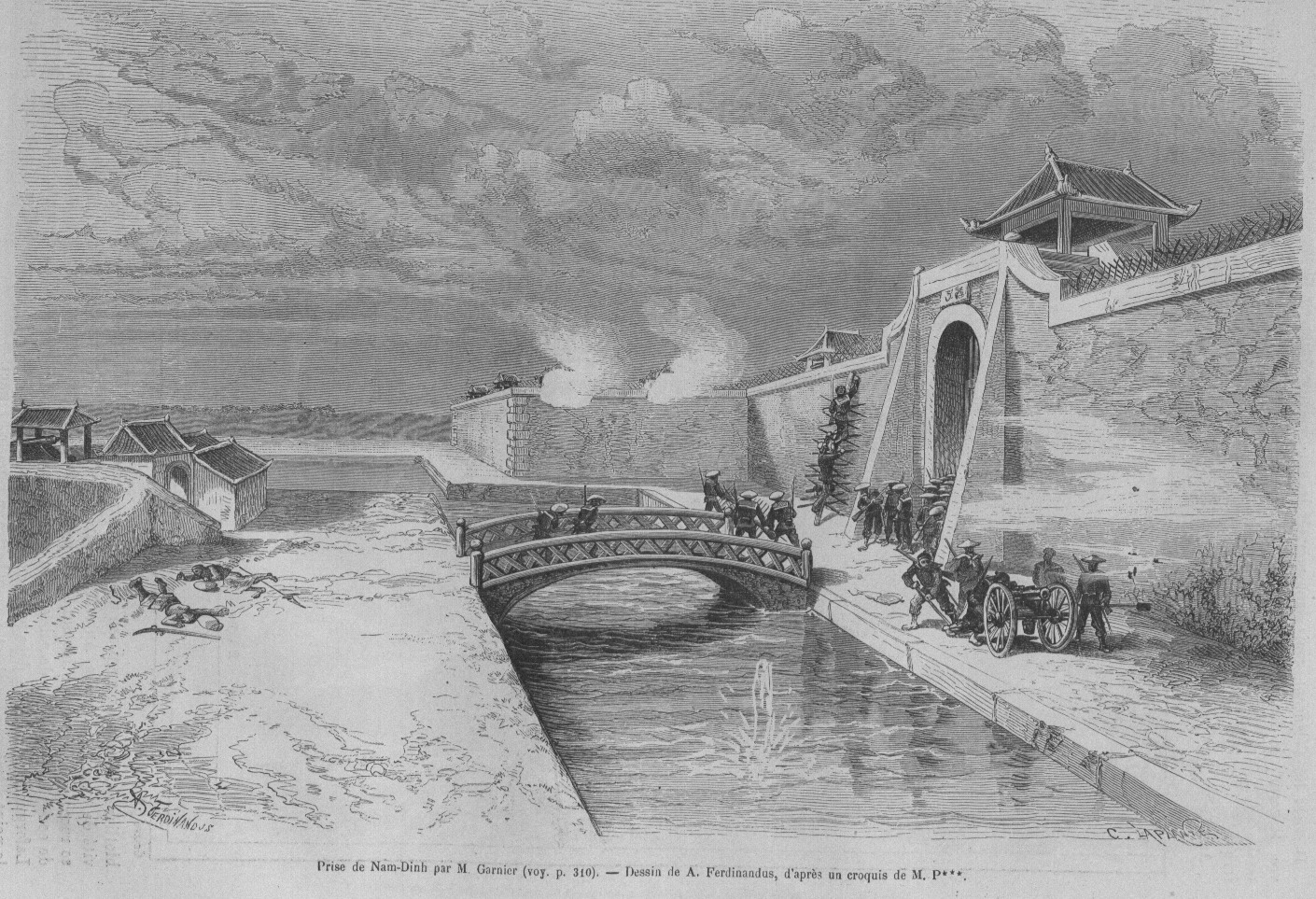
French troops attack Nam Định fortress.

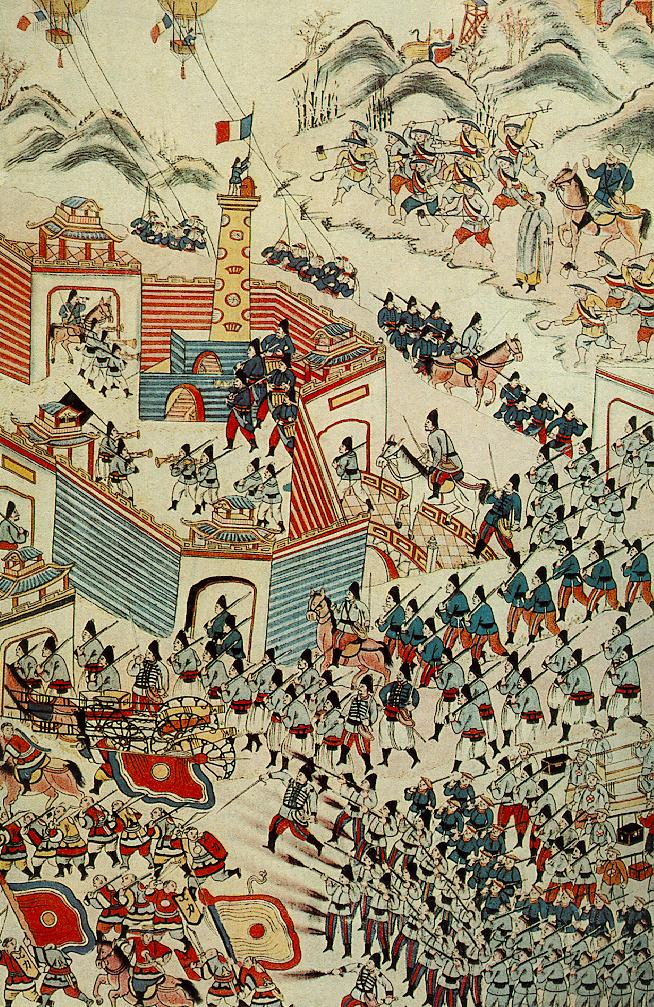
Capture of Hưng Hóa

By the late 1860s, pirates, bandits, and remnants of the Taiping rebellion in China, fled to Tonkin and turned Northern Vietnam into a hotbed for their raid activities. The Vietnamese state was too weak to fight against the pirates. These Chinese rebels eventually formed their own mercenary armies as the Black Flags had done and cooperated with local Vietnamese officials to interfere with French business interests. As France was looking to acquire Yunnan and Tonkin, when in 1873, a French merchant-adventurer named Jean Dupuis was intercepted by local Hanoi authority, the French Cochinchina government responded by sending out a new attack without talking with the Hue court. A French army led by Francis Garnier arrived at Tonkin in November. Because local administrators had allied with the Black Flags and mistrusted of Hanoi governor Nguyễn Tri Phương, in late November the French and Lê loyalists opened fire at the Vietnamese citadel of Hanoi. Tự Đức immediately sent delegations to negotiate with Garnier, but Prince Hoàng Kế Viêm, governor of Sơn Tây, had enlisted the Chinese Black Flags militia of Liu Yongfu to attack the French. Garnier was killed on 21 December by the Black Flag soldiers at the Battle of Cầu Giấy. A peace negotiation between Vietnam and France was reached on 5 January 1874. France formally recognized Vietnam's full independence from China; France would pay off Vietnam's Spanish debts; French force returned Hanoi to the Vietnamese; the Vietnamese military in Hanoi had to disband and be reduced to a simple police force; total religious and trade freedom was ensured; Vietnam was compelled to recognise all six southern provinces as French territories.

==== End of independence (1874–1885) ====
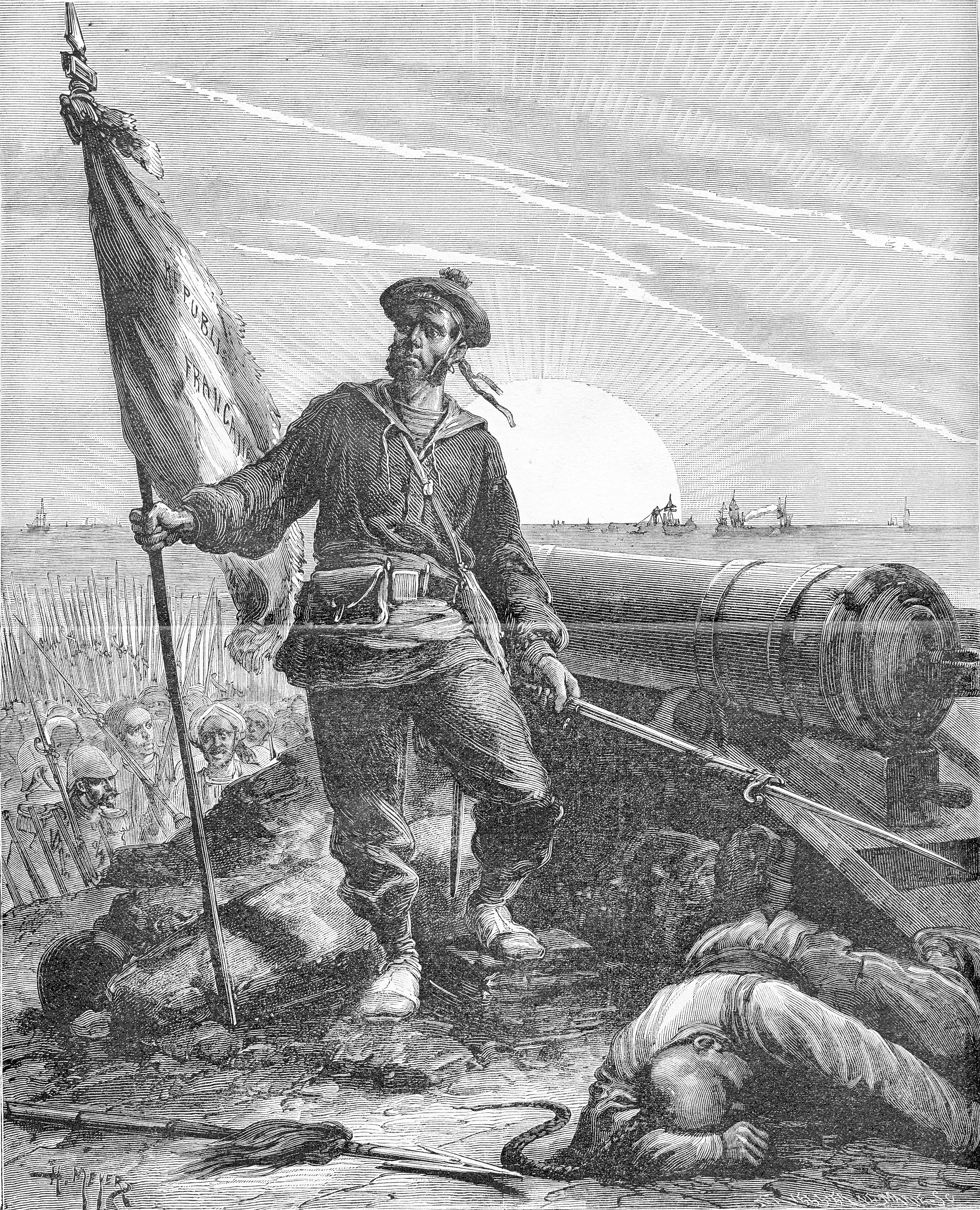
French victory at Thuận An fortress, August 1883.

Just two years after French recognition, Tự Đức sent an embassy to Qing China in 1876 and re-provoked the tributary relationship with the Chinese (the last mission was in 1849). In 1878, Vietnam renewed relations with Thailand. In 1880, Britain, Germany, and Spain were still debating the fate of Vietnam, and the Chinese Embassy in Paris openly rejected the 1874 Franco-Vietnamese agreement. In Paris, Prime Minister Jules Ferry proposed a direct military campaign against Vietnam to revise the 1874 treaty. Because Tự Đức was too preoccupied to keep the French out of his Empire without directly engaging against them, he requested assistance from the Chinese court. In 1882, 30,000 Qing troops flooded into the northern provinces and occupied cities. The Black Flags had also been returning, together, collaborating with local Vietnamese officials and harassing French businesses. In March, the French responded by sending a second expedition led by Henri Rivière to the north to deal with these various problems but had to avoid all international attention, particularly from China. On 25 April 1882, Rivière took Hanoi without facing any resistance. Tự Đức informed the Chinese court that their tributary state was being attacked. In September 1882, 17 Chinese divisions (200,000 men) crossed the Sino-Vietnamese borders and occupied Lạng Sơn, Cao Bằng, Bac Ninh, and Thái Nguyên, under the pretext of defending against the French aggression.

Admiral Amédée Courbet and Harmand at Huế, August 1883

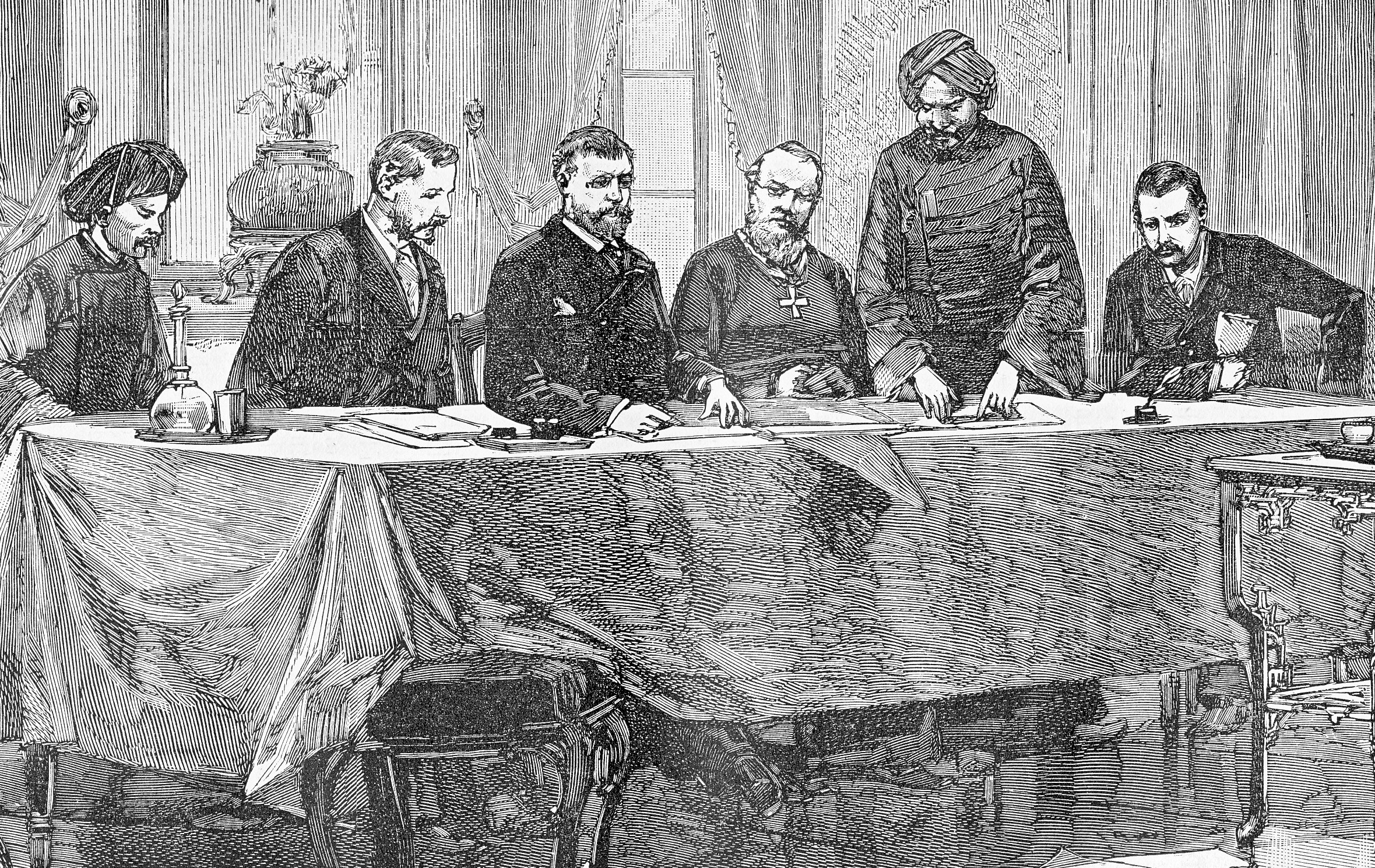
Signing of the Treaty of Huế, 25 August 1883

French propaganda painting in Hanoi, 1942

Backed by the Chinese army and prince Hoàng Kế Viêm, Liu Yongfu, and the Black Flags decided to attack Rivière. On 19 May 1883, the Black Flags ambushed and beheaded Rivière at the Second Battle of Cầu Giấy. When news of Rivière's death reached France, there was immediate outcry and demands for a response. The French Parliament quickly voted for the conquest of Vietnam. Tens of thousands of French and Chinese reinforcements poured into the Red River Delta.

Tự Đức died on 17 July. Succession trouble temporarily paralyzed the court. One of his nephews Nguyễn Phúc Ưng Ái was crowned as Emperor Dục Đức but was, however, imprisoned and executed after three days by the three powerful regents Nguyễn Văn Tường, Tôn Thất Thuyết and Tran Tien Thanh for unknown reasons. Tự Đức's brother Nguyễn Phúc Hồng Dật succeeded on 30 July as Emperor Hiệp Hòa. The senior Censorate official of the court Phan Đình Phùng denounced the three regents for their irregular handling of Tự Đức's succession. Tôn Thất Thuyết excoriated Phan Đình Phùng and sent him from the court to his home territory, where later he led a nationalist resistance movement against the French for ten years.

To knock Vietnam out of the war, France decided to take a direct assault on the city of Huế. The French army split up itself into two parts: the smaller under General Bouët stayed in Hanoi and waited for reinforcement from France while the French fleet led by Amédée Courbet and Jules Harmand sailed to Thuận An, the sea gate of Hue on 17 August. Harmand demanded the two regents Nguyễn Văn Tường and Tôn Thất Thuyết surrender Northern Vietnam, North-Central Vietnam (Thanh Hoá, Nghệ An, Hà Tĩnh) and Bình Thuận Province to French possession, and to accept a French résident in Huế who could demand imperial audiences. He sent an ultimatum to the regents that "The name Vietnam will no longer exist in history" if they did not comply with this.

On 18 August, French battleships began shelling Vietnamese positions in the Thuận An citadel. Two days later, at dawn, Courbet and the French marines landed on the shore. By the next morning, all Vietnamese defenses in Huế were overwhelmed by the French. Emperor Hiệp Hòa dispatched mandarin Nguyễn Thượng Bắc to negotiate.

On 25 September, two court officials, Trần Đình Túc and Nguyễn Trọng Hợp signed a twenty-seven-article treaty known as Harmand Convention. The French were granted Bình Thuận; Đà Nẵng and Qui Nhơn were opened for trade; the ruling sphere of the Vietnamese monarchy was reduced to Central Vietnam while Northern Vietnam became a French Protectorate. In November, Emperor Hiệp Hòa and Trần Tiễn Thành were executed by Nguyễn Văn Tường and Tôn Thất Thuyết for their perceived pro-French sympathies. 14-year-old Nguyễn Phúc Ưng Đăng was crowned as Emperor Kiến Phúc. After achieving peace with China through the Tientsin Accord in May 1884, on 6 June the French Ambassador in China Jules Patenôtre des Noyers signed with Nguyen Van Tuong the Protectorate Treaty of Patenôtre, which confirmed French dominion over Vietnam. On 31 May 1885, France appointed the first governor of all Vietnam. On 9 June 1885, Vietnam ceased to exist after 83 years as an independent state. The leader of the pro-war faction, Tôn Thất Thuyết and his supporters revolted against the French in July 1885, but were forced to retreat to the Laotian highlands with the young emperor Hàm Nghi (Nguyễn Phúc Ưng Lịch.) Meanwhile, the French installed his pro-French brother Nguyễn Phúc Ưng Kỷ as emperor Đồng Khánh. Thuyết called up the nobility, loyalists and nationalists to arm for the resistance against the French occupation (Cần Vương movement). The movement lasted for 11 years (1885–1896) and Thuyết was forced to exile in China in 1888.

=== French protectorates of Annam and Tonkin (1883–1945) ===
The 1883 Treaty of Huế led to the rest of Vietnam becoming French protectorates, divided into the Protectorates of Annam and Tonkin. The terms were, however, considered overly harsh in French diplomatic circles and never ratified in France. The following 1884 Treaty of Huế provided a softened version of the previous treaty. The 1885 Treaty of Tientsin, which reaffirmed the 1884 Tientsin Accord and ended the Sino-French War, confirmed Vietnam's status as French protectorates and severed Vietnam's tributary relationship with the Qing dynasty by requiring that all of Vietnam's foreign affairs be conducted through France.

After this the Nguyễn dynasty only nominally ruled the two French protectorates. Annam and Tonkin were combined with Cochinchina and the neighboring Cambodian protectorate in 1887 to form the Union of French Indochina, of which they became administrative components.

French rule also reinforced ingredients that the Portuguese had already added to Vietnam's cultural stew: Catholicism and a Latin-based alphabet. The spelling used in the Vietnamese transliteration is in fact Portuguese-based, because the French relied on a dictionary compiled earlier by a Portuguese cleric, Francisco de Pina. Due to their presence in Macau, the Portuguese were also the ones who brought Catholicism to Vietnam in the XVI Century, although it was the French who built most of the churches and established missions in the country.

==== World War I ====
While seeking to maximize the use of Indochina's natural resources and manpower to fight World War I, France cracked down on Vietnam's patriotic mass movements. Indochina (mainly Vietnam) had to provide France with 70,000 soldiers and 70,000 workers, who were forcibly drafted from villages to serve on the French battlefront. Vietnam also contributed 184 million piastres in loans and 336,000 tons of food.

These burdens proved heavy since agriculture experienced natural disasters from 1914 to 1917. Lacking a unified nationwide organization, the vigorous Vietnamese national movement failed to use the difficulties France had as a result of the war to stage significant uprisings.

In May 1916, sixteen-year-old emperor Duy Tân escaped from his palace to participate in an uprising of Vietnamese troops. The French were informed of the plan, and its leaders were arrested and executed. Duy Tân was deposed and exiled to the island of Réunion in the Indian Ocean. Nguyen Dong Xi had died of pneumonia.

==== World War II ====
Nationalist sentiment intensified in Vietnam (especially during and after the First World War), but uprisings and tentative efforts failed to obtain concessions from the French. The Russian Revolution greatly impacted 20th-century Vietnamese history.

For Vietnam, the outbreak of World War II on 1 September 1939 was as decisive as the 1858 French seizure of Đà Nẵng. The Axis power of Japan invaded Vietnam on 22 September 1940, attempting to construct military bases to strike against Allied forces in Southeast Asia. This led to a period of Indochina under Japanese occupation with the cooperation of the collaborationist Vichy French, who still retained the administration of the colony. During this time the Viet Minh, a communist resistance movement, developed under Ho Chi Minh from 1941, with allied support. During 1944–1945 famine in northern Vietnam, over one million people starved to death.

=== Empire of Vietnam (1945) ===
In March 1945, after the liberation of France and heavy setbacks in the war, the Japanese in a last ditch effort to gather support in Indochina overthrew the French administration, imprisoned their civil servants and proclaimed independence for Cambodia, Laos and Vietnam, which became the Empire of Vietnam with Bảo Đại as its Emperor. The Empire of Vietnam was a puppet state of the Empire of Japan. Following the surrender of Japan, Bảo Đại abdicated on 25 August 1945 after the Viet Minh launched the August Revolution.

This ended the 143-year reign of the Nguyễn dynasty. Bảo Đại was later restored to power by the French to become head of state of the State of Vietnam in 1949 until the country became a republic in 1955; however, this period is not considered as part of the Nguyễn dynasty.

== National administration ==
=== Government ===
==== Emperor ====
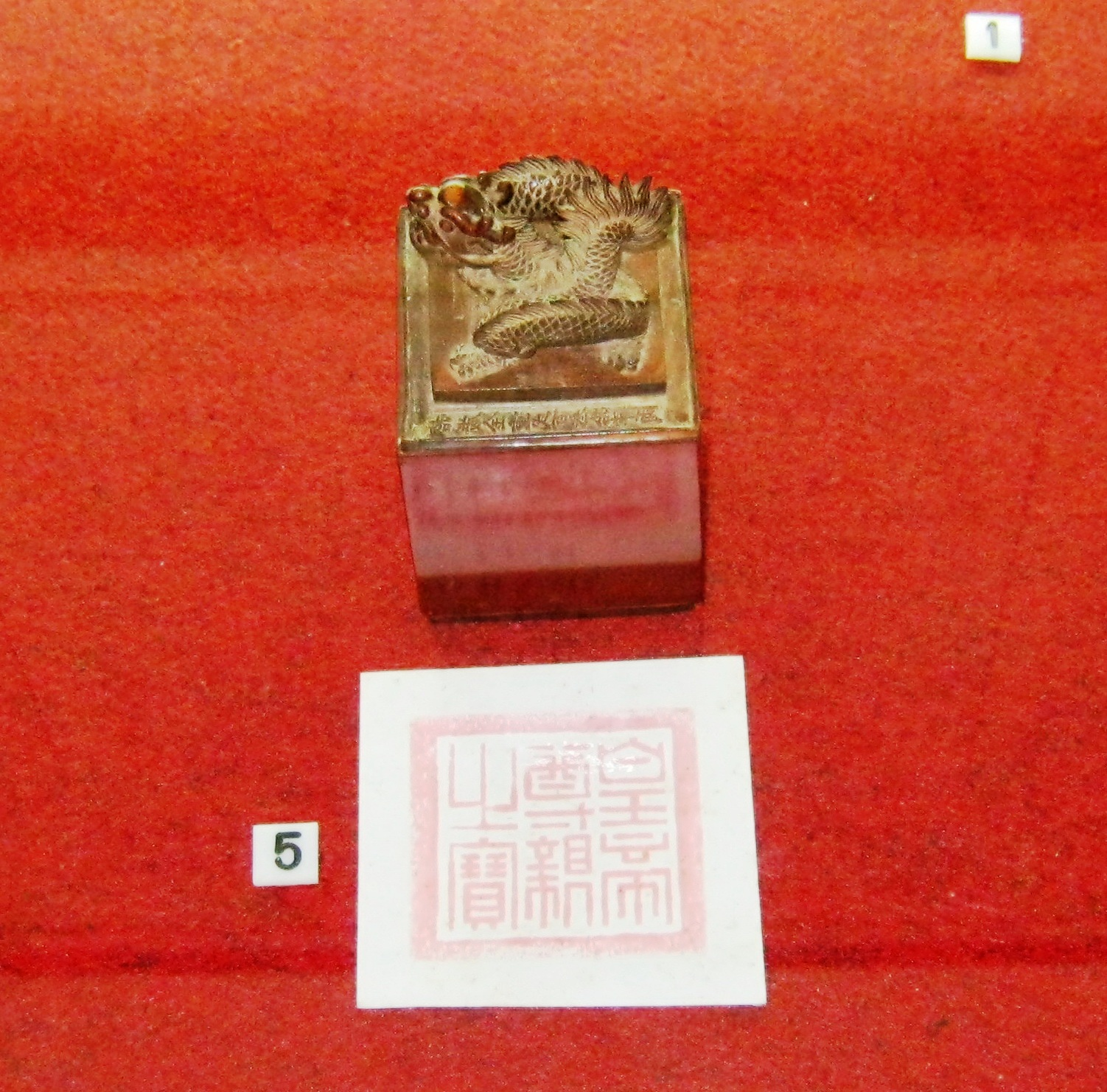
Imperial seal, decorated with a dragon, and its imprint against a red background.

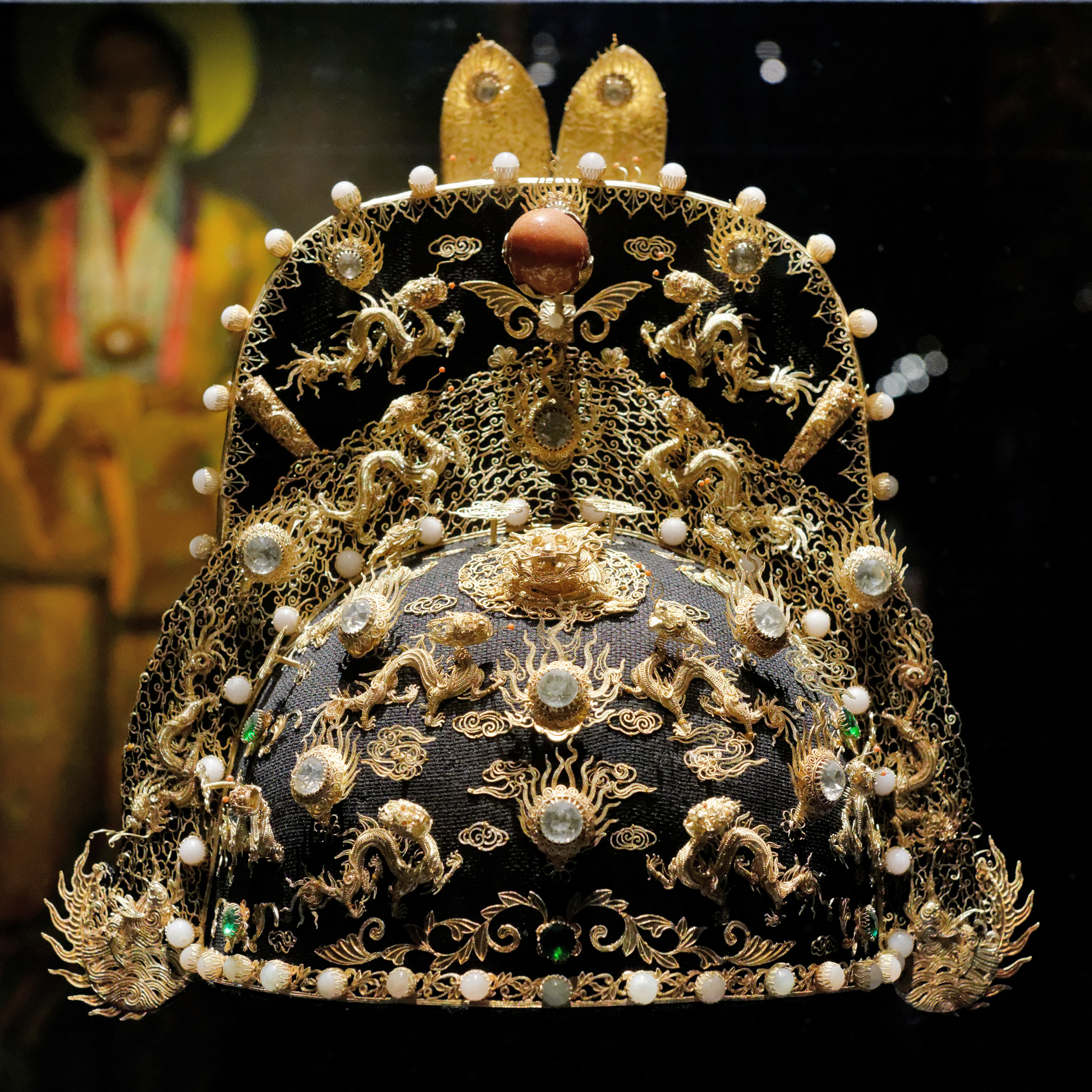
Nine-dragons Imperial Crown (Cửu Long thông thiên quan, 九龍通天冠) influenced by Chinese Yishan guan (翼善冠).

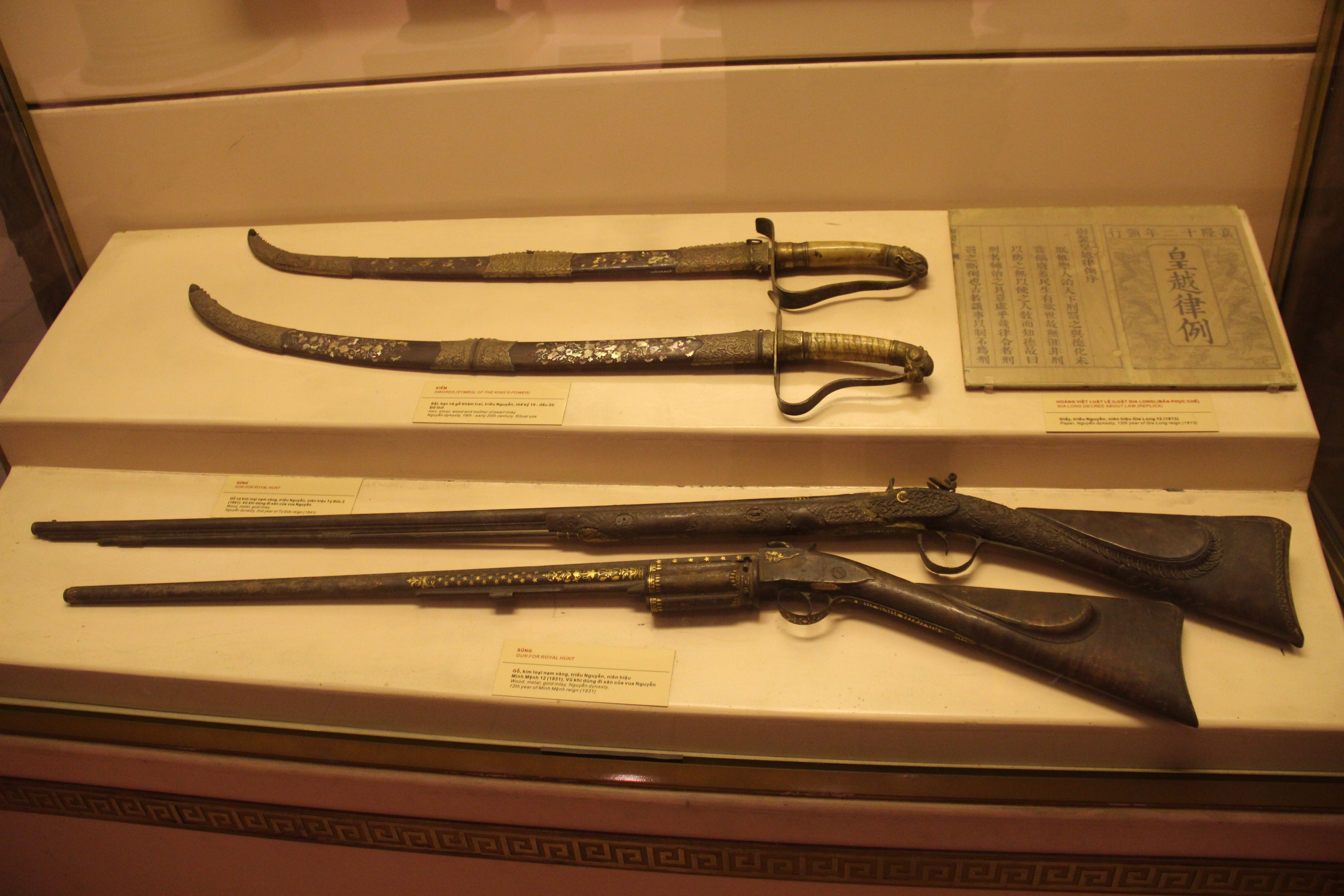
Imperial sword and hunting rifle of emperor Minh Mang.

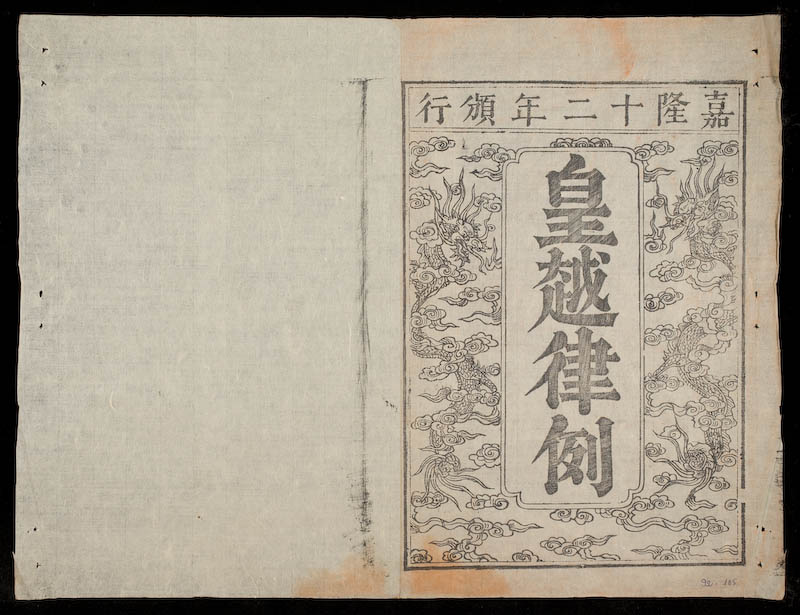
Hoàng Việt luật lệ (皇越律例), Code of law introduced by Gia Long.

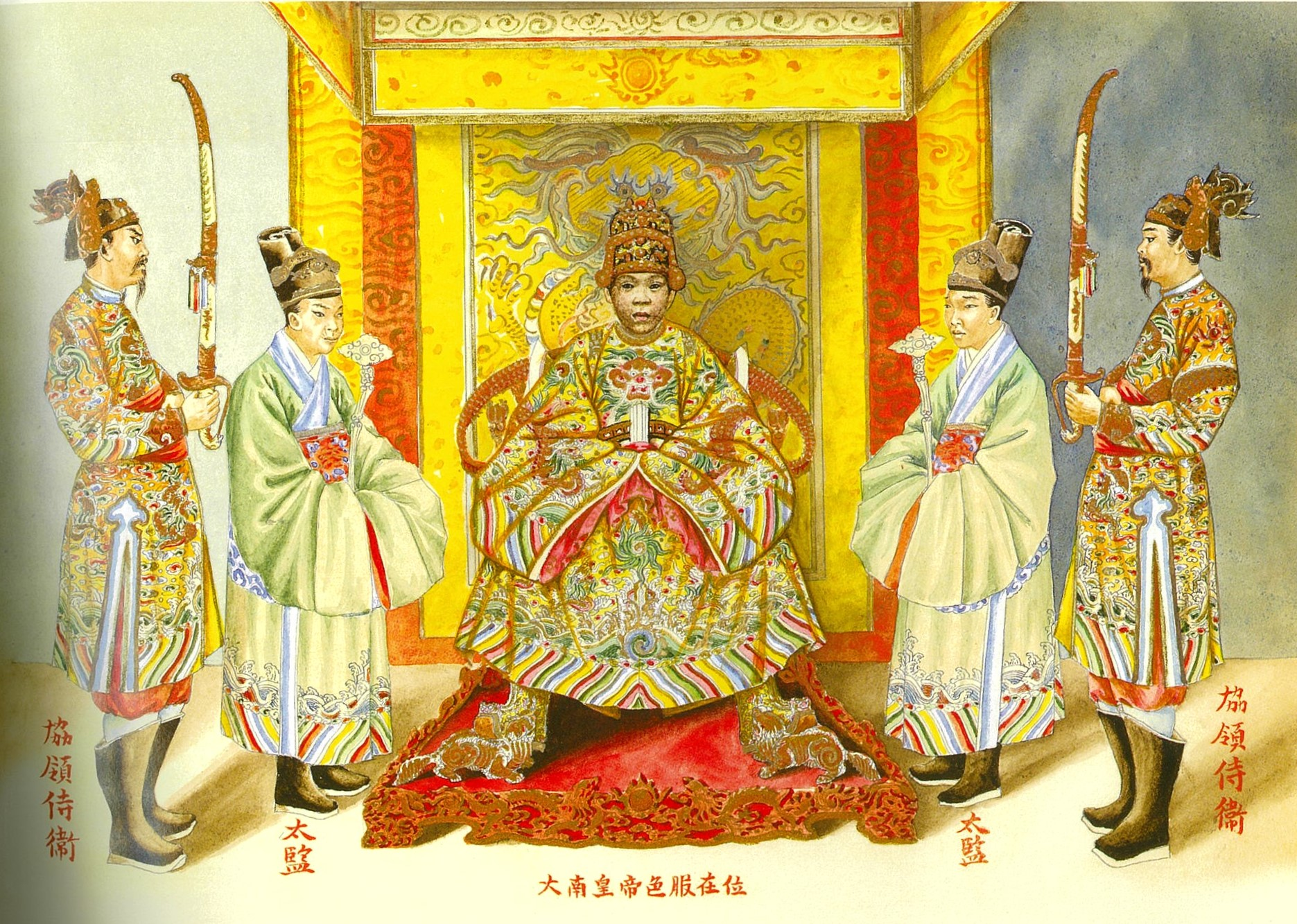
Court dress of Emperor.
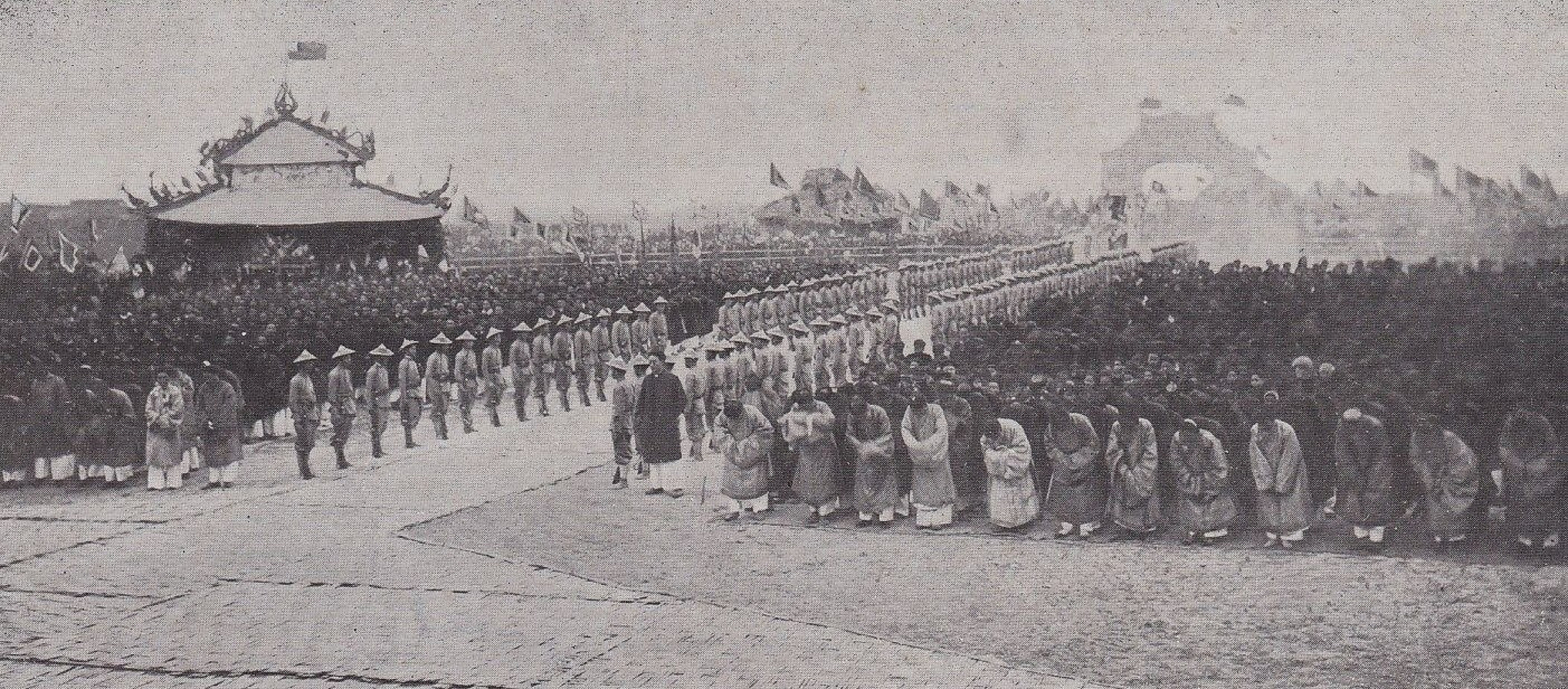
The welcome ceremony of emperor Bảo Đại's visit to the ancestral tombs of the Nguyễn lords in Thanh Hóa, 4 November 1932.

The Nguyễn dynasty retained the bureaucratic and hierarchic system of previous dynasties. The emperor was the head of state who wielded absolute authority. Under the emperor was the Ministry of Interior (which worked on papers, imperial messages and recording) and four Grand Secretariats (Vietnamese: Tứ trụ Đại thần; 四柱大臣), later renamed the Ministry of Secret Council.

The Emperor of the Nguyễn dynasty was an absolutist ruler, which means he was both the head of state and the head of government. The Gia Long Code in 1812 declared the Vietnamese monarch as the universal ruler of all Vietnam; using the Confucian concept of the Mandate of Heaven to provide monarchs absolute power. Their reign and popular images were judged based on how prosperous the livelihood (民生, dân sinh) of the people and the Confucian concept of chính danh (rectification of names), where according to the Confucian biblical Analects, everything has to stay in its right order. Gia Long also perceived the ancient Chinese conception of Hua-Yi and in 1805 he confessed his Empire as Trung Quốc (中國, "the Middle Kingdom"), the Vietnamese term which often refers to China but now was taken by Gia Long to emphasis his Son of Heaven status and the devaluation of China. Following next decades, Confucianism and the Mandate of Heaven theory gradually lost their positions among the Vietnamese officials and intellectuals. When the fourth emperor, Tự Đức, ceded Southern Vietnam to France and called all Southern officials to give up arms, many ignored, disobeyed the Son of Heaven and continued to fight against invaders. Many dissents viewed him as surrendering and frightened of France. Rebellions against Tự Đức erupted every year from 1860 until he died in 1883.

A dual theory of sovereignty existed in Vietnam. All the Nguyễn monarchs were addressed as hoàng đế (黃帝, Sino-Vietnamese title for "Emperor") in the court while referring himself the first person honorific trẫm (he who give the order). They also used the concept of thiên tử (天子, "Son of Heaven", which is borrowed from China) to demonstrate that the ruler was descended and commissioned by heaven to rule the kingdom. However, in most cases, Nguyen rulers were formally called vua (𪼀, the Vietnamese title for "monarch" or " sovereign ruler") by the ordinary Vietnamese folks. The concept of a divine Son of Heaven has not been dogmatically practiced, and the monarch's divinity was not absolute due to the dual theory. For example, Xu Jiyu, a Chinese geographer, reported that the bureaucrats in the Vietnamese court sat down and even felt free to search themselves for body lice during the court audiences. Gia Long once told the son of J.B. Chaigneau, one of his advisors, that the use of Son of Heaven in Vietnam was an "absurdity" and "at least in mixed Vietnamese–European Company." Once the young crown prince is chosen to succeed, his obligation is to be filial with parents, be well-educated in politics and classics, and internalize the morals and ethics of a ruler.

After the 1884 Treaty of Huế was signed, the Nguyễn dynasty became two protectorates of France and the French installed their own administrators. Although the Emperors of the Nguyễn dynasty were still nominally in control of the protectorates of Annam and Tonkin, the Resident-Superior of Annam gradually gained more influence over the imperial court in Huế. In 1897 the Resident-Superior was granted the power to appoint the Nguyễn dynasty Emperors and presided over the meetings of the Viện cơ mật. These moves incorporated French officials directly into the administrative structure of the Imperial Huế Court and further legitimized French rule in the legislative branch of the Nguyễn government. From this period onwards any imperial edicts issued by the Emperors of Đại Nam had to be confirmed by the Resident-Superior of Annam giving him both legislative and executive power over the Nguyễn government.

In the year 1898, the federal government of French Indochina took over the financial and property management duties of the Nguyễn dynasty's imperial court meaning that the Nguyễn dynasty Emperor (at the time Thành Thái) became a salaried employee of the Indochinese colonial structure, reducing their power to being only a civil servant of the Protectorate government. The Resident-Superior of Annam also took over the management of provincial mandarins and was a member of the Supreme Council (Conseil supérieur) of the Government-General of French Indochina.

==== Civil service and bureaucracy ====
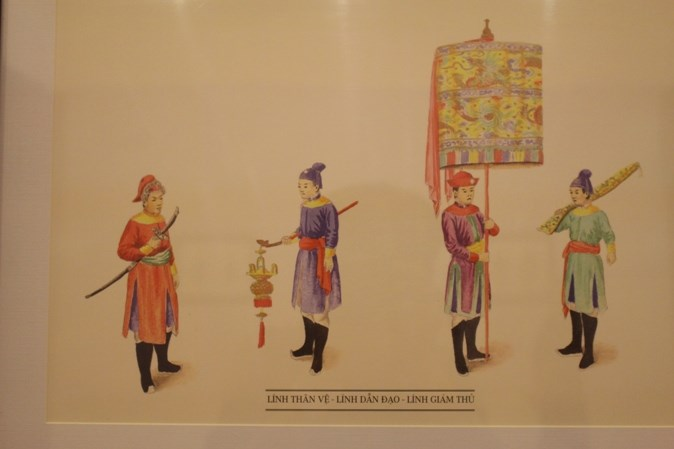
The imperial guards of the Nguyễn dynasty.

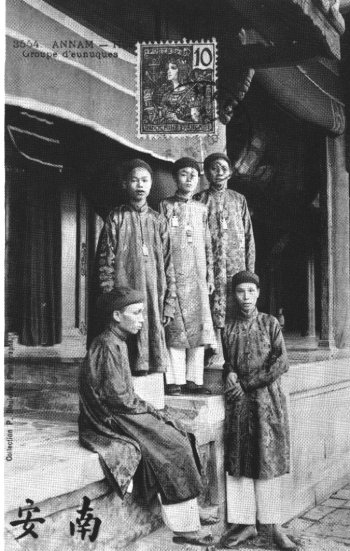
The eunuchs of the Nguyễn dynasty.

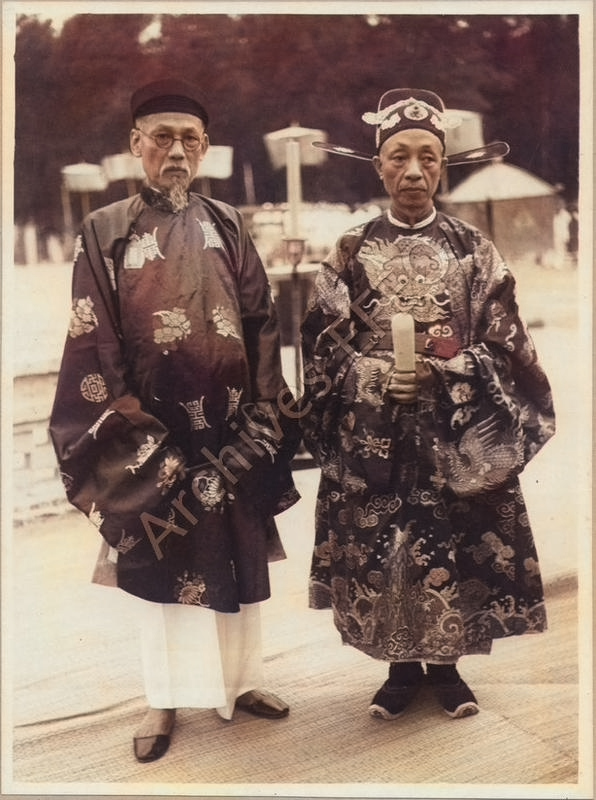
Imperial family member (left) in the traditional Áo tấc and mandarin (right) in the imperial court dress.

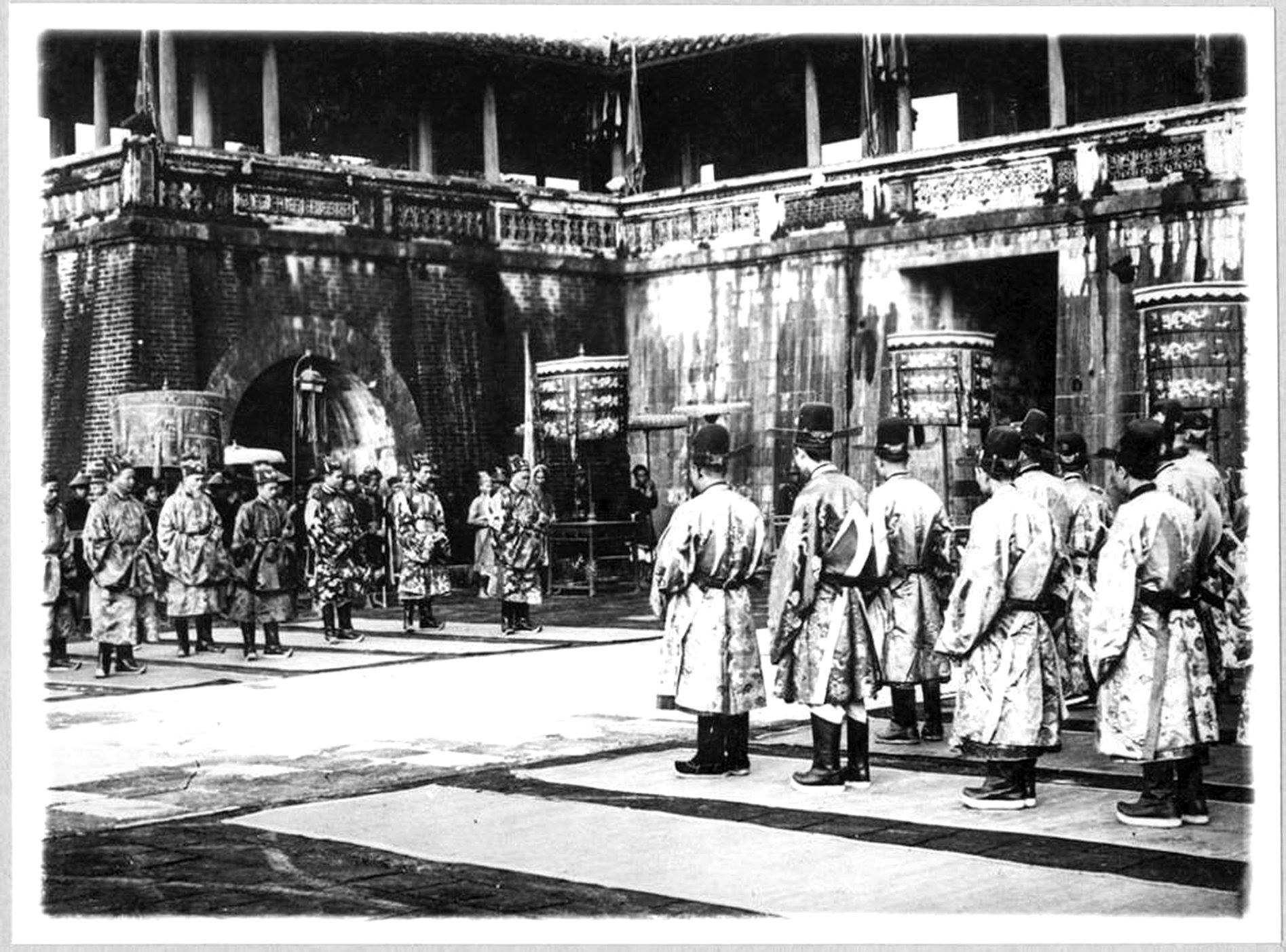
Mandarin conducted ceremony in front of Imperial palace in 1939.

Rank	Civil position	Military position	Pictures
Upper first rank (Bậc trên nhất phẩm)	Imperial Clan Court (Tông Nhân Phủ, Tôn nhân lệnh); Three Ducal Ministers (Tam công): * Grand Preceptor (Thái sư) * Grand Tutor (Thái phó) * Grand Protector (Thái bảo)	Same	Dress code of imperial members (Hoàng Thân, 皇親), Nam Giao ceremonial dress (left) and court dress (right).
First senior rank (Chánh nhất phẩm, 正一品)	Left Right Imperial Clan Court (Tôn nhân phủ, Tả Hữu tôn chính"); Three Vice-Ducal Ministers (Tam Thiếu) * Vice Preceptor (Thiếu sư) * Vice Tutor (Thiếu phó) * Vice Protector (Thiếu bảo)	Same	Dress code of first senior rank of civil mandarins.
First junior rank (Tòng nhất phẩm 從一品)	Council of State (Tham chính viện); House of Councillors (Tham Nghị viện); Grand Secretariat (Thị trung Đại học sĩ)	Banner Unit Lieutenant General, General-in-Chief, Provincial Commander-in-Chief	Dress code of first senior (left) and junior (right) rank of military mandarins.
Second senior rank (Chánh nhị phẩm, 正二品)	6 ministries (Lục bộ): * Ministry of Personnel (Lại Bộ) * Ministry of Rites (Lễ Bộ) * Ministry of Justice (imperial China) (Hình Bộ) * Ministry of Finance (Hộ Bộ) * Ministry of Public Works (Công Bộ) * Ministry of Defense (Binh Bộ); Supreme Censorate (Đô sát viện, Tả Hữu Đô ngự sử)	Banner Captain General, Commandants of Divisions, Brigade General	
Second junior rank (Tòng nhị phẩm, 從二品)	6 Ministerial Advisors (Lục bộ Tả Hữu Tham tri); Grand coordinator and provincial governor (Tuần phủ); Supreme Vice-Censorate (Đô sát viện, Tả Hữu Phó đô ngự sử)	Major General, Colonel	Dress code of second senior (left) & junior (right) rank of military mandarins.
Third senior rank (Chánh tam phẩm, 正三品)	Senior Head of 6 Ministries (Chánh thiêm sự); Administration Commissioner (Cai bạ); Surveillance Commissioner (Ký lục); State Auxiliary Academician of Secretariat (Thị trung Trực học sĩ); Court Auxiliary Academician (Trực học sĩ các điện); Court academician (Học sĩ các điện); Provincial governor (Hiệp trấn các trấn)	Brigadiers of Artillery & Musketry, Brigadier of Scouts, Banner Division Colonel	Third senior (left) and junior (right) rank of military mandarin
Third junior rank (Tòng tam phẩm, 從三品)	Junior Head of Six Ministries (Thiếu thiêm sự); Senior Palace Administration Commissioner (Cai bạ Chính dinh); Chargé d'affaires (Tham tán); Court of Imperial Seals (Thượng bảo tự); General Staff (Tham quân)	Banner Brigade Commander	
Fourth senior rank (Chánh tứ phẩm, 正四品)	Provincial Education Commissioner of Guozijian (Quốc tử giám Đốc học); Head of six ministries (Thiếu thiêm sự); Junior Court of Imperial Seals (Thượng bảo thiếu Khanh); Grand Secretaries (Đông các học sĩ); Administration Commissioner of Trường Thọ palace (Cai bạ cung Trường Thọ); Provincial Advisor to Defense Command Lieutenant Governor (Tham hiệp các trấn)	Lieutenant Colonel of Artillery, Musketry & Scouts Captain, Police Major	
Fourth junior rank (Tòng tứ phẩm, 從四品)	Provincial Vice Education Commissioner of Guozijian (Quốc tử giám phó Đốc học), Prefect (Tuyên phủ sứ),	Captain, Assistant Major in Princely Palaces	
Fifth senior rank (Chánh ngũ phẩm, 正五品)	Inner Deputy Supervisors of Instruction at Hanlin Institutes, Sub-Prefects	Police Captain, Lieutenant or First Lieutenant	Fifth senior (left) and junior (right) rank of civil mandarin.
Fifth junior rank (Tòng ngũ phẩm, 從五品)	Assistant Instructors and Librarians at Imperial and Hanlin Institutes, assistant directors of Boards and Courts, Circuit Censors	Gate Guard Lieutenants, Second Captain	Fifth senior (left) and junior (right) rank of military mandarin.
Sixth senior rank (Chánh lục phẩm, 正六品)	Secretaries & Tutors at Imperial & Hanlin Institutes, Secretaries and Registrars at Imperial Offices, Police Magistrate	Bodyguards, Lieutenants of Artillery, Musketry & Scouts, Second Lieutenants	
Sixth junior rank (Tòng lục phẩm, 從六品)	Assistant Secretaries in Imperial Offices and Law Secretaries, Provincial Deputy Sub-Prefects, Buddhist & Taoist priests	Deputy Police Lieutenant	
Seventh senior rank (Chánh thất phẩm, 正七品)	None	City Gate Clerk, Sub-Lieutenants	Seventh senior (left) and junior (right) rank of mandarin.
Seventh junior rank (Tòng thất phẩm, 從七品)	Secretaries in Offices of Assistant Governors, Salt Controllers & Transport Stations	Assistant Major in Nobles' Palaces	
Eighth senior rank (Chánh bát phẩm, 正八品)	None	Ensigns	
Eighth junior rank (Tòng bát phẩm, 從八品)	Sub-director of Studies, Archivists in Office of Salt Controller	First Class Sergeant	
Ninth senior rank (Chánh cửu phẩm, 正九品)	None	Second Class Sergeant	Ninth senior rank (left) and junior rank mandarin (right)
Ninth junior rank (Tòng cửu phẩm, 從九品)	Prefectural Tax Collector, Deputy Jail Warden, Deputy Police Commissioner, Tax Examiner	Third Class Sergeant, Corporal, First & Second Class Privates	

=== Taxes ===
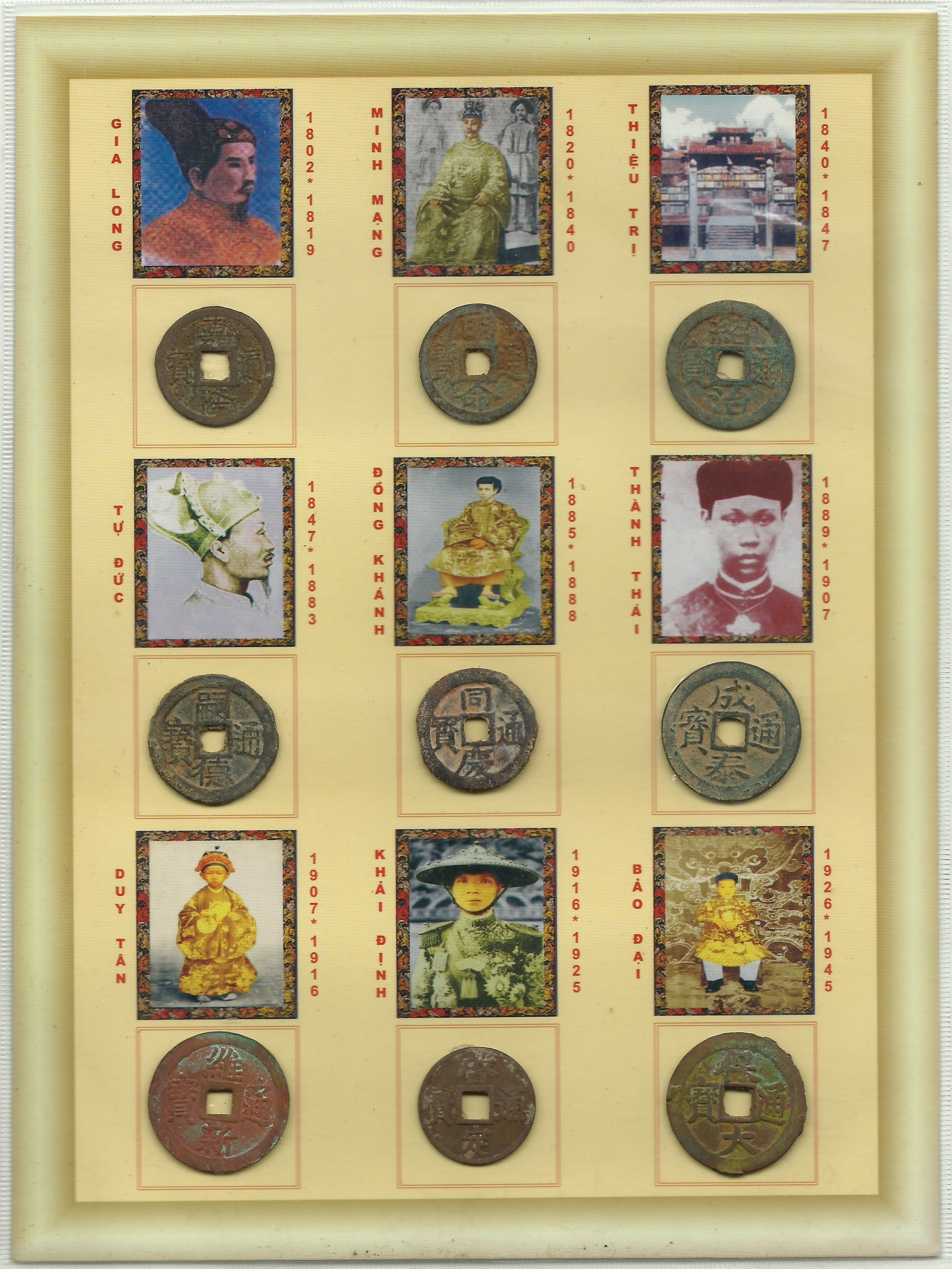
Nguyễn dynasty coins

Vietnam's monetary subunit was the quan (貫). One quan equaled 10 coins, equivalent to ₫600. In 1839, Emperor Minh Mạng determined that officials received the following taxes (Vietnamese: thuế đầu người):

- First senior rank (Chánh nhất phẩm, 正一品): 400 quan; rice: 300 kg; per-capita tax: 70 quan
- First junior rank (Tòng nhất phẩm, 從一品): 300 quan; rice: 250 kg; tax: 60 quan
- Second senior rank (Chánh nhị phẩm, 正二品): 250 quan; rice: 200 kg; tax: 50 quan
- Second junior rank (Tòng nhị phẩm, 從二品): 180 quan; rice: 150 kg; tax: 30 quan
- Third senior rank (Chánh tam phẩm, 正三品): 150 quan; rice: 120 kg; tax: 20 quan
- Third junior rank (Tòng tam phẩm, 從三品): 120 quan; rice: 90 kg; tax: 16 quan
- Fourth senior rank (Chánh tứ phẩm, 正四品): 80 quan; rice: 60 kg; tax: 14 quan
- Fourth junior rank (Tòng tứ phẩm, 從四品): 60 quan; rice: 50 kg; tax: 10 quan
- Fifth senior rank (Chánh ngũ phẩm, 正五品): 40 quan; rice: 43 kg; tax: 9 quan
- Fifth junior rank (Tòng ngũ phẩm, 從五品): 35 quan; rice: 30 kg; tax: 8 quan
- Sixth senior rank (Chánh lục phẩm, 正六品): 30 quan; rice: 25 kg; tax: 7 quan
- Sixth junior rank (Tòng lục phẩm, 從六品): 30 quan; rice: 22 kg; tax: 6 quan
- Seventh senior rank (Chánh thất phẩm, 正七品): 25 quan; rice: 20 kg; tax: 5 quan
- Seventh junior rank (Tòng thất phẩm, 從七品): 22 quan; rice: 20 kg; tax: 5 quan
- Eighth senior rank (Chánh bát phẩm, 正八品): 20 quan; rice: 18 kg; tax: 5 quan
- Eighth junior rank (Tòng bát phẩm, 從八品): 20 quan; rice: 18 kg; tax: 4 quan
- Ninth senior rank (Chánh cửu phẩm, 正九品): 18 quan; rice: 16 kg; tax: 4 quan
- Ninth junior rank (Tòng cửu phẩm, 從九品): 18 quan; rice: 16 kg; tax: 4 quan

Officials from the first to third ranks received taxes twice a year, while those from the fourth to seventh ranks received taxes at the end of the four seasons. The eighth and ninth-ranked officials did so every month in a year. The Emperor also granted an annual "dưỡng liêm" money to prevent corruption among regional administrators.

=== Political organization ===
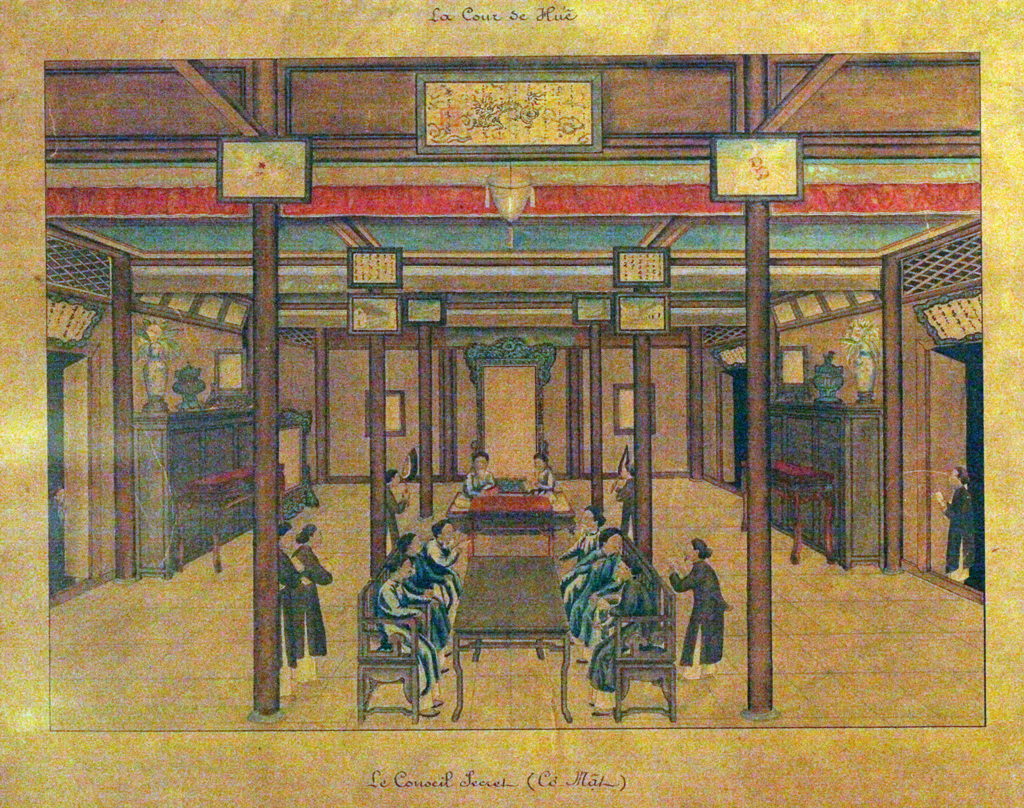
Privy Council of Nguyễn Dynasty (Cơ Mật Viện: 機密院).

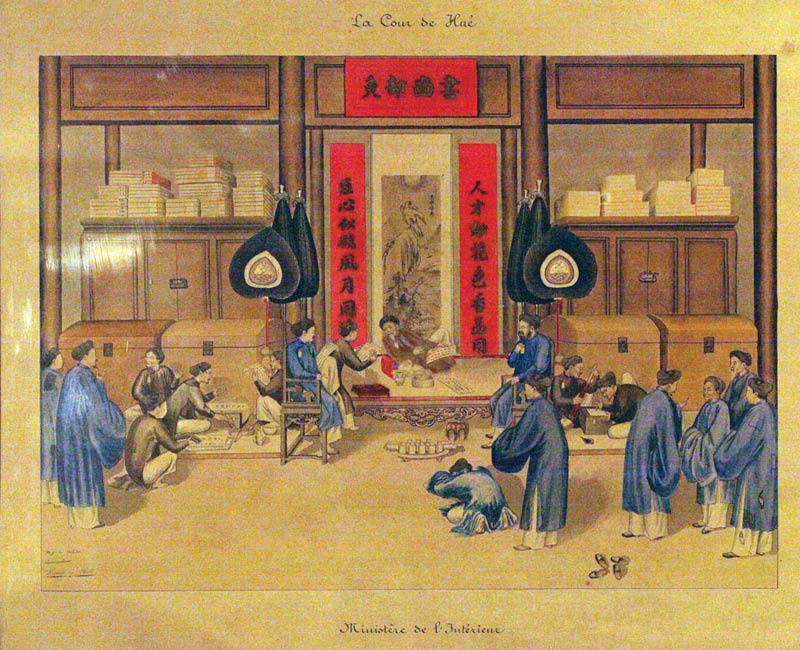
Ministry of Administration of Nguyễn Dynasty (Lại Bộ).

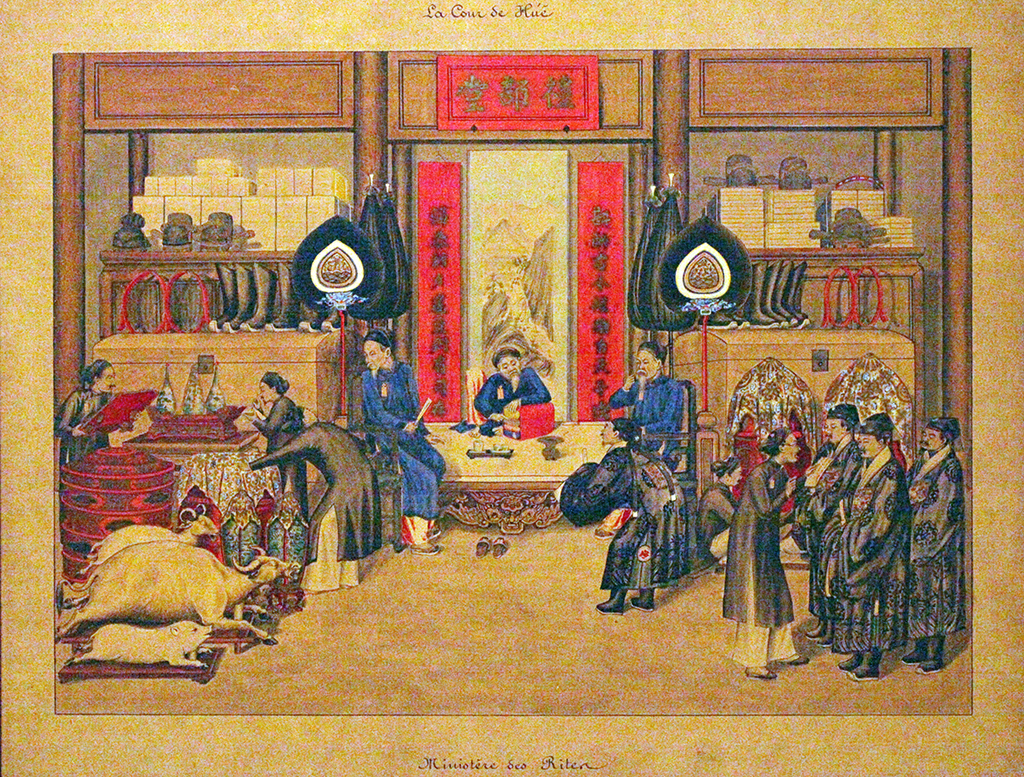
Ministry of Rites of Nguyễn Dynasty (Lễ Bộ: 禮部).

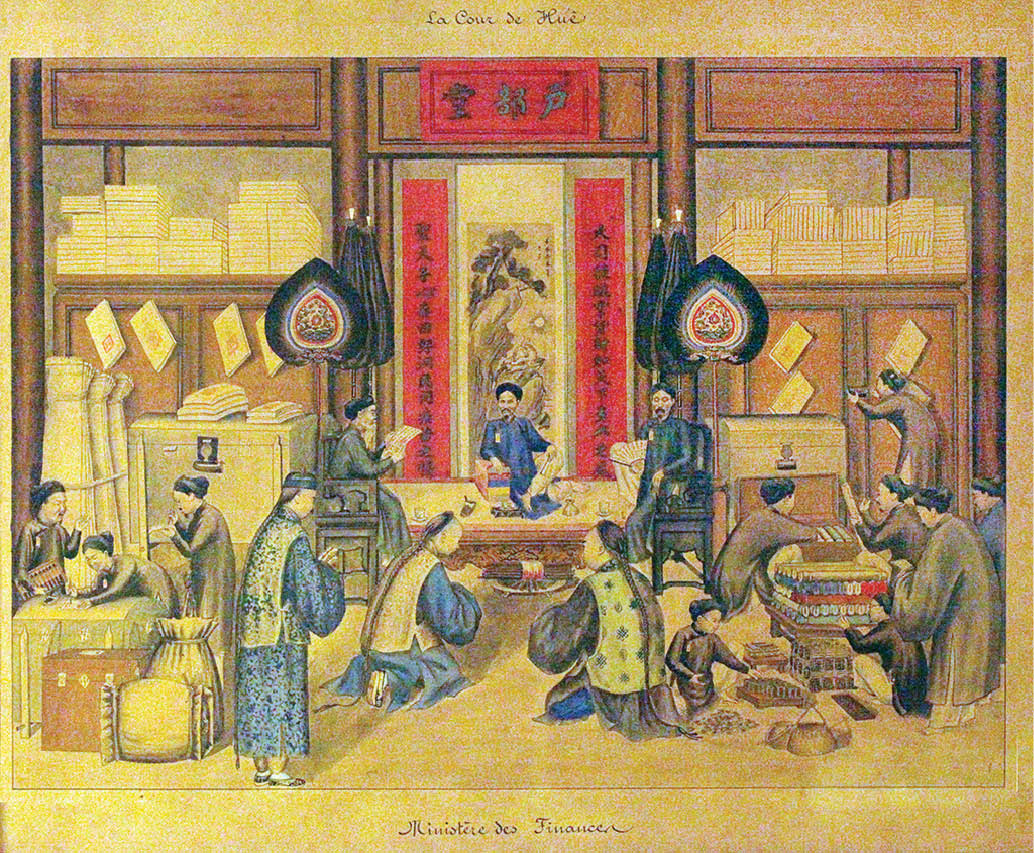
Ministry of Finance of Nguyễn Dynasty (Hộ Bộ: 戸部).

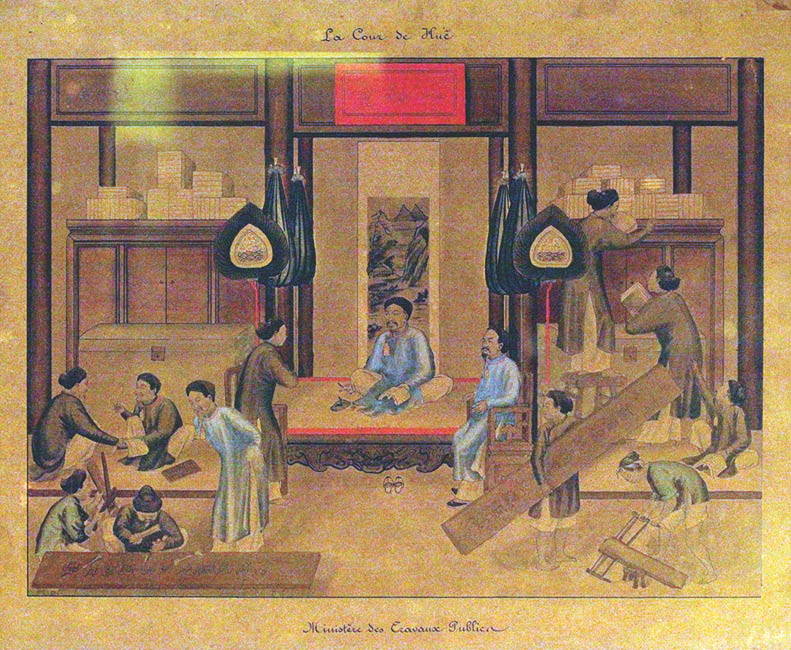
Ministry of Public Works of Nguyễn Dynasty (Công Bộ: 工部).

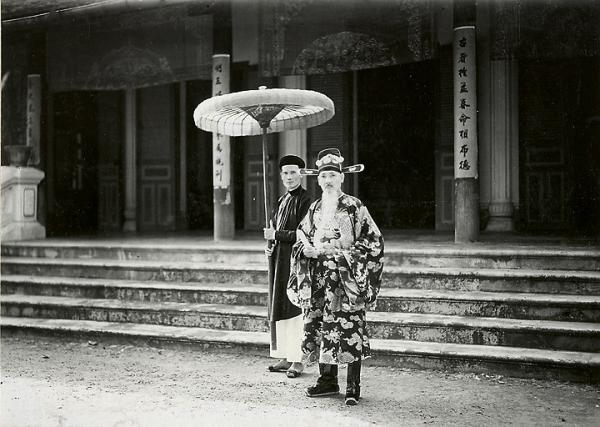
Tôn Thất Đàn, Minister of Justice of Nguyễn Dynasty (Hình Bộ).

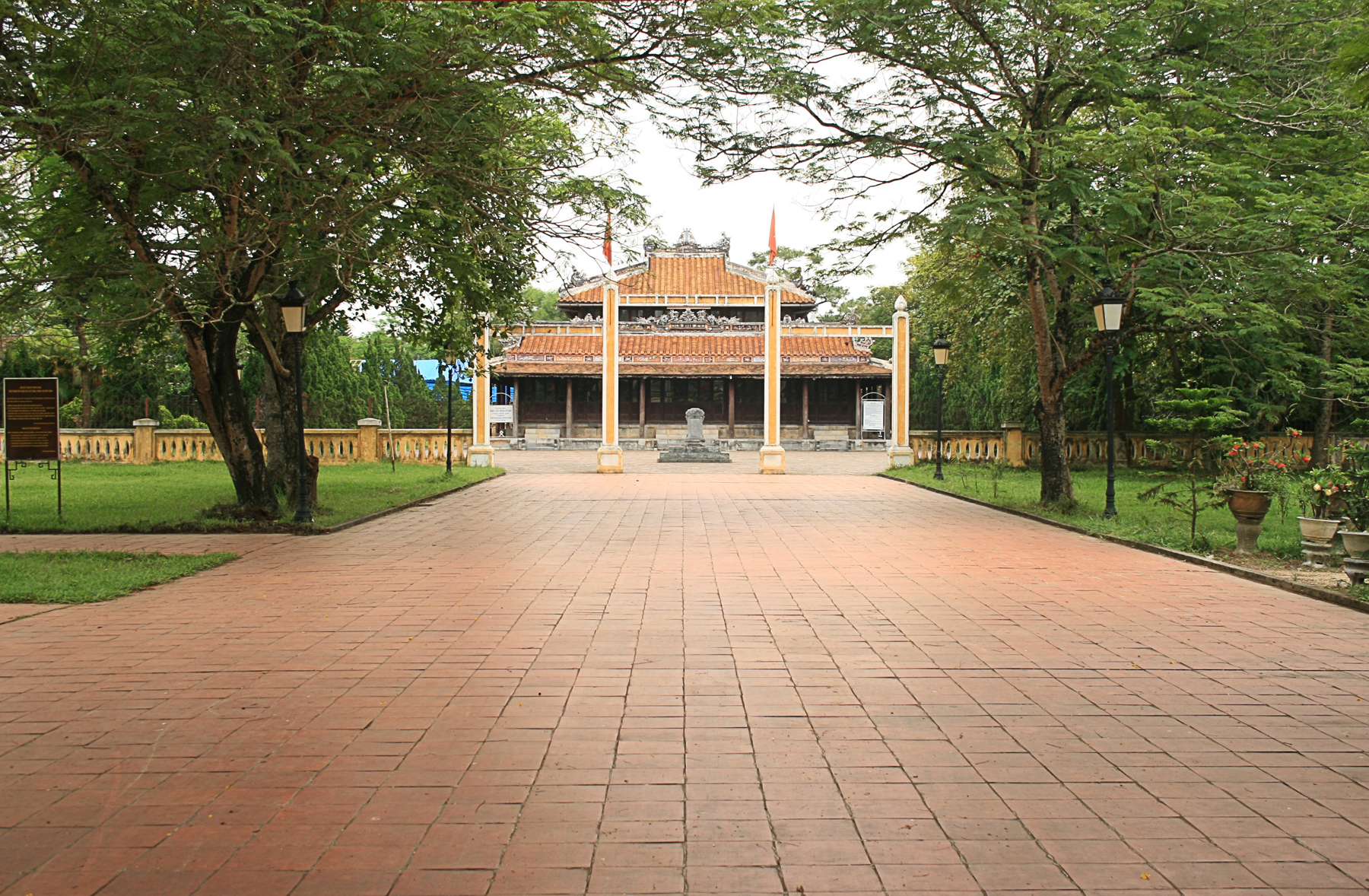
Imperial Academy, Huế under Ministry of Education of Nguyễn Dynasty (Học Bộ).

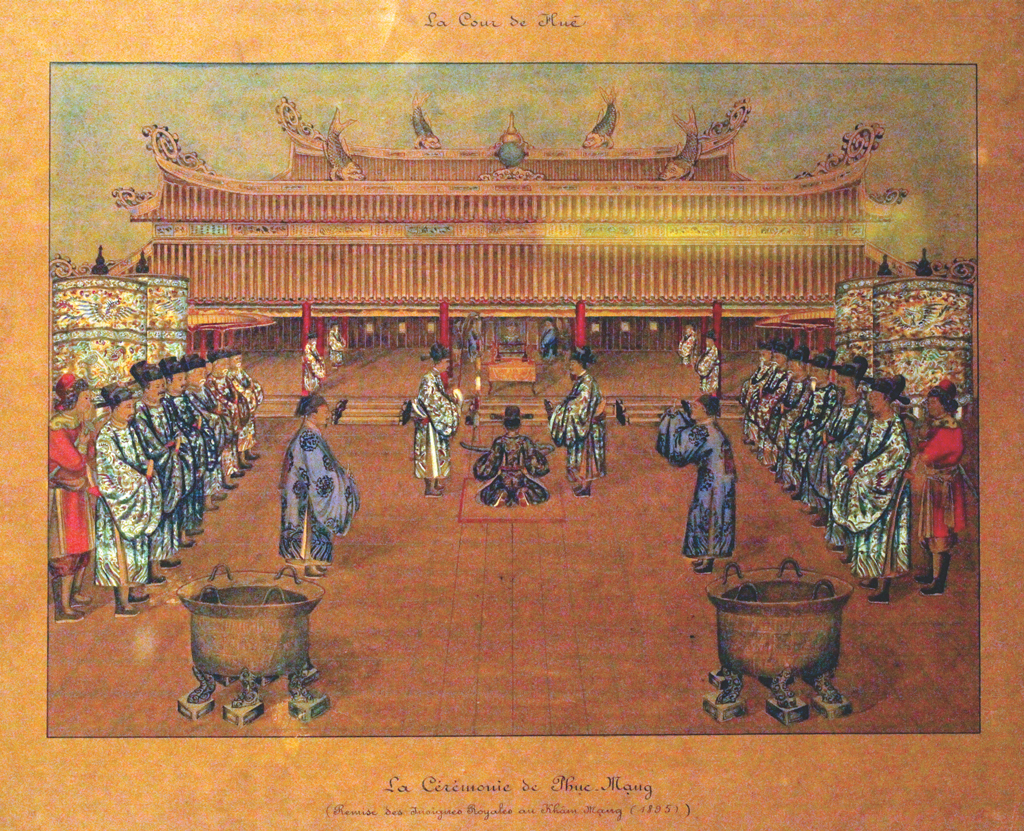
Phục mạng (服命) ceremony when mandarin receive edict from the Emperor in 1895.

=== Colonial education ===
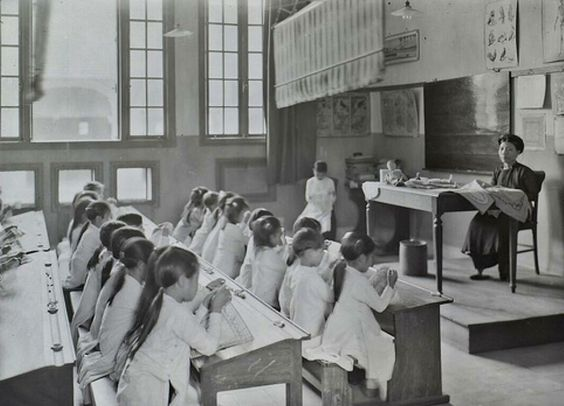
Tailoring class in a colonial school in Hanoi, Tonkin

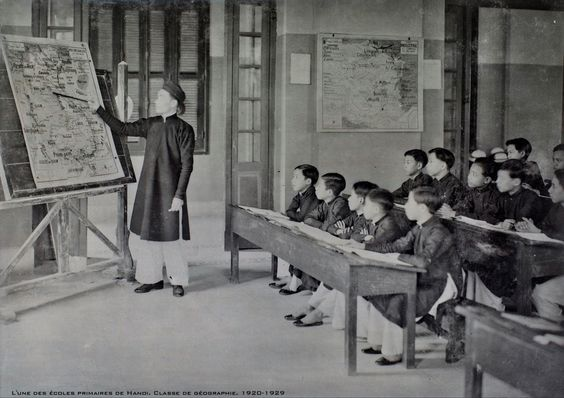
Geography class in a colonial school. Hanoi, 1920

=== Pension ===
When mandarins retired, they could receive one hundred to four hundred quan from the emperor. When they died, the imperial court provided twenty to two hundred quan for a funeral.

== Administrative divisions ==
=== Under Gia Long ===
During the reign of Gia Long, the kingdom was divided into twenty-three quasi-militant protectorates trấn and four military departments doanh. Each protectorate, besides having their own separated regional governments, was under patrol of one greater, powerful unit called Overlord of Citadel, or the Viceroy. For examples, the northern protectorates had Bắc thành Tổng trấn (Viceroy of Northern Protectorates) in Hanoi, and southern protectorates had Gia Định thành Tổng trấn (Viceroy of Gia Định Protectorates) resides in Saigon. Two famously viceroys during Gia Long's reign were Nguyễn Văn Thành (Hanoi) and Lê Văn Duyệt (Saigon). By 1802, these were:

- 16 protectorates under joint-governance from the Viceroys.
1. Sơn Nam Thượng (Hanoi)
2. Sơn Nam Hạ (Nam Định)
3. Sơn Tây
4. Kinh Bắc (Bắc Ninh)
5. Hải Dương
6. Tuyên Quang
7. Hưng Hoá
8. Cao Bằng
9. Lạng Sơn
10. Thái Nguyên
11. Quảng Yên
12. Gia Định or Phiên An
13. Biên Hoà
14. Vĩnh Thanh (later became Vĩnh Long and An Giang
15. Định Tường (Tiền Giang)
16. Hà Tiên
- 7 Central protectorates
1. Thanh Hoá
2. Nghệ An
3. Quảng Nghĩa (Quảng Ngãi)
4. Bình Định
5. Phú Yên
6. Bình Hoà (Khánh Hoà)
7. Bình Thuận
- 4 departments surrounding Huế, directly ruled by Gia Long.
1. Quảng Đức
2. Quảng Bình
3. Quảng Trị
4. Quảng Nam

=== Minh Mạng and later ===
In 1831, Minh Mạng reorganised his kingdom by converting all these protectorates into 31 provinces (tỉnh). Each province had a series of smaller jurisdictions: the prefecture (phủ), the subprefecture (châu, in areas whereas having a significant population of ethnic minorities). Under prefecture and subprefecture, there was the district (huyện), the canton (tổng). Under district and canton, the bundle of hamlets around one common religious temple or social factor point, the village (làng or the commune xã) was the lowest administrative unit, which one respected person nominally took care of village administrative, which called lý trưởng.

Two nearby provinces were combined into a pair. Every pair had a governor-general (Tổng đốc) and a governor (Tuần phủ). Frequently, there were twelve governor-generals and eleven governors, although, in some periods, the Emperor would appoint a "commissioner in charge of patrolled borderlands" (kinh lược sứ) that supervising entire northern of the southern part of the kingdom. In 1803, Vietnam had 57 prefectures, 41 subprefectures, 201 districts, 4,136 cantons and 16,452 villages, and then by the 1840s it had been increased to 72 prefectures, 39 subprefectures and 283 districts, which an average 30,000 people per district. Cambodia had been absorbed into the Vietnamese administrative system, bore the name Tây Thành Province from 1834 to 1845. With areas having minority groups like Tày, Nùng, Mèo (Hmong people), Mường, Mang and Jarai, the Huế court imposed the co-existing tributary and quasi-bureaucratic governance system, while allowing these people to have their own local rulers and autonomy.

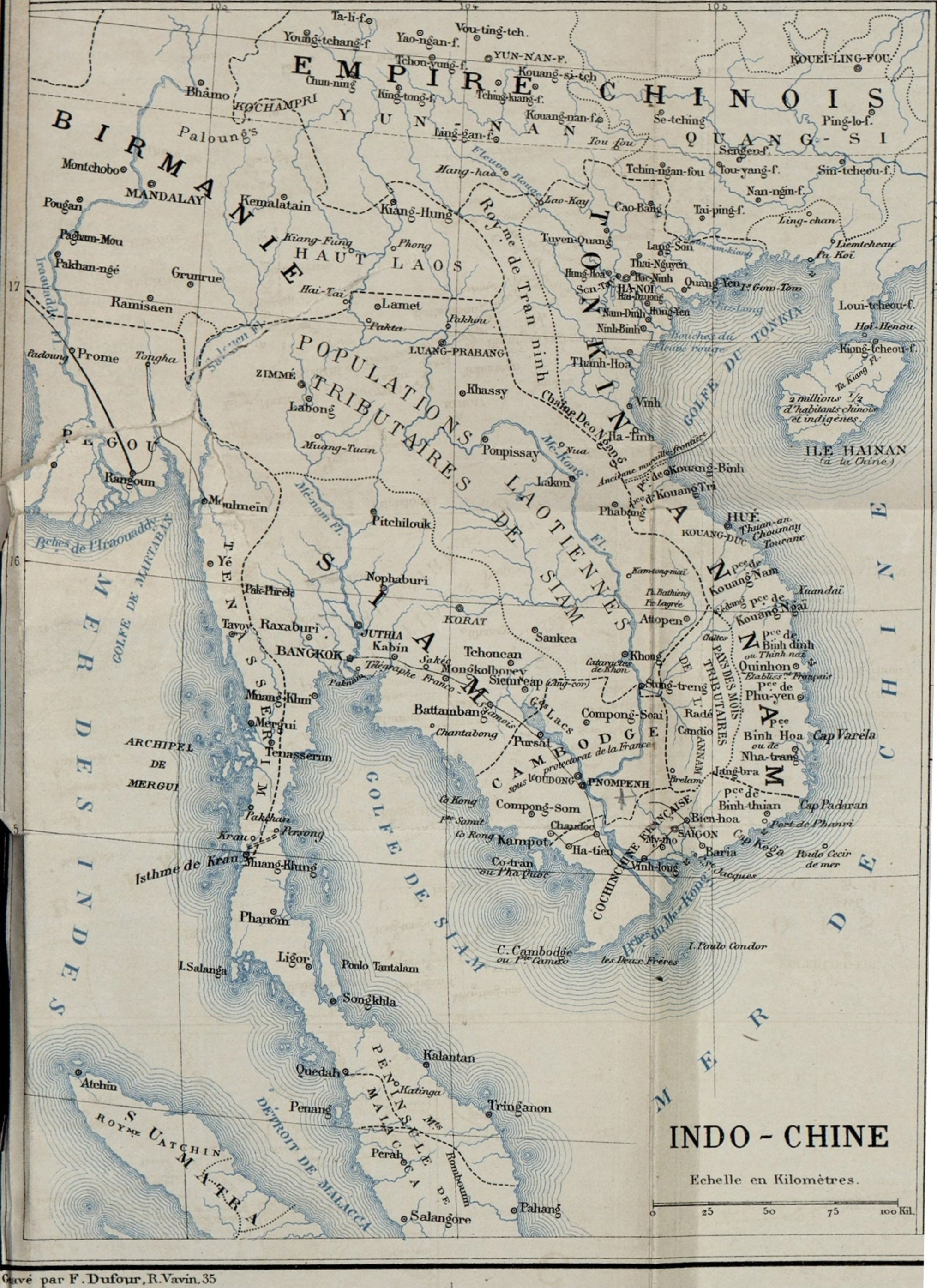
Map of 1883 Indochina Peninsula, shows three Vietnamese regions and client territories (Pays des Mois and Royme de Tran-ninh) of the Vietnamese Crown.

In 1832, there were:

- Three regions and 31 provinces (encompassed modern-day Vietnam):
1. Bắc Kỳ (Tonkin)
  1. Hanoi
  2. Lạng Sơn
  3. Cao Bằng
  4. Bắc Ninh
  5. Thái Nguyên
  6. Nam Định
  7. Hưng Yên
  8. Sơn Tây
  9. Hưng Hoá
  10. Tuyên Quang
  11. Hải Dương
  12. Quảng Yên
  13. Ninh Bình
2. Trung Kỳ (Annam)
  1. Thanh Hoá
  2. Nghệ An
  3. Hà Tĩnh
  4. Quảng Bình
  5. Quảng Trị
  6. Thừa Thiên
  7. Quảng Nam
  8. Quảng Ngãi
  9. Bình Định
  10. Phú Yên
  11. Khánh Hoà
  12. Bình Thuận
3. Nam Kỳ (Cochinchina)
  1. Biên Hoà
  2. Gia Định
  3. Vĩnh Long
  4. Định Tường
  5. An Giang
  6. Hà Tiên
- Client/dependent territories:
1. Luang Phrabang
2. Vientine
3. Cambodia
4. Jarai chiefdoms
- Chief cities:
1. Huế, capital city, population (1880): 30,000
2. Hanoi, major city, population (1880): 120,000
3. Saigon, major city, population (1880): 100,000

== Society ==
=== Culture and cultural discrimination ===
The Nguyễn dynasty viewed cultures that were "non-Chinese" as barbaric and called themselves the Central Kingdom (Trung Quốc, 中國). This includes the Han Chinese under the Qing dynasty who were viewed as "non-Chinese". As the Qing have caused the Chinese to not be "Han" anymore. Chinese were referred to as Thanh nhân (清人). This occurred after Vietnam had sent a delegate to Beijing, whereupon a diplomatic disaster caused Vietnam to view other "non-Chinese" as barbaric in much the same way as the Qing. By the Nguyễn dynasty the Vietnamese themselves were ordering Cambodian Khmer to adopt Vietnamese culture by ceasing "barbarous" habits like cropping hair and ordering them to grow it long besides making them replace skirts with trousers. Han Chinese Ming dynasty refugees numbering 3,000 came to Vietnam at the end of the Ming dynasty. They opposed the Qing dynasty and were fiercely loyal to the Ming dynasty. Vietnamese women married these Han Chinese refugees since most of them were soldiers and single men. They did not wear Manchu hairstyle unlike later Chinese migrants to Vietnam during the Qing dynasty.

=== Vietnamisation of ethnic minorities ===
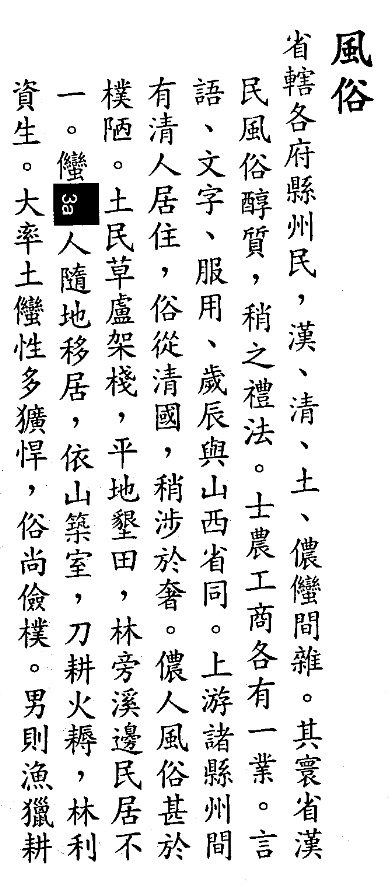
A Đồng Khánh-period text regarding the demographics of the Hưng Hóa Province referring to the ethnic groups as "Hán (-Vietnamese)" (漢), "Thanh" (清), and "Thổ" (土). This indicates that during the beginning of the period of French domination the Vietnamese still maintained the "Hoa-Di distinction" while the indigenous peoples and the subjects of the Manchu Qing (Thanh) dynasty were viewed as "less civilised".

Under emperor Minh Mạng sinicisation of ethnic minorities became state policy. He claimed the legacy of Confucianism and China's Han dynasty for Vietnam, and used the term "Han people" (漢人, Hán nhân) to refer to the Vietnamese. According to the emperor, "We must hope that their barbarian habits will be subconsciously dissipated, and that they will daily become more infected by Han [Sino-Vietnamese] customs." These policies were directed at the Khmer and hill tribes. Nguyễn Phúc Chu had referred to the Vietnamese as "Han people" in 1712, distinguishing them from the Chams. The Nguyễn lords established colonies after 1790. Gia Long said, "Hán di hữu hạn" (漢 夷 有 限, "The Vietnamese and the barbarians must have clear borders"), distinguishing the Khmer from the Vietnamese. Minh Mang implemented an acculturation policy for minority non-Vietnamese peoples. "Thanh nhân" (清 人 referring to the Qing dynasty) or "Đường nhân" (唐人 referring to the Tang dynasty) were used to refer to ethnic Chinese by the Vietnamese, who called themselves "Hán dân" (漢 民) and "Hán nhân" (漢人 referring to the Han dynasty) during 19th-century Nguyễn rule. Since 1827, descendants of Ming dynasty refugees were called Minh nhân (明人) or Minh Hương (明 鄉) by Nguyễn rulers, to distinguish with ethnic Chinese. Minh nhân were treated as Vietnamese since 1829. They were not allowed to go to China, and also not allowed to wear the Manchu queue.

=== Clothing ===
The Nguyễn dynasty popularized Qing-influenced clothing. Trousers were adopted by female White H'mong speakers, replacing their traditional skirts. The Qing-influenced tunics and trousers were worn by the Vietnamese. The áo dài was developed in the 1920s, when compact, close-fitting tucks were added to predecessor of the áo dài, áo ngũ thân. Chinese-influenced trousers and tunics were ordered by lord Nguyễn Phúc Khoát during the 18th century, replacing traditional Vietnamese áo tràng vạt derived from Chinese jiaoling youren (Chinese: 交領右衽). Although the Chinese-influenced trousers and tunic were mandated by the Nguyen government, skirts were worn in isolated north Vietnamese hamlets until the 1920s. Chinese style clothing was ordered for the Vietnamese military and bureaucrats by Nguyễn Phúc Khoát.

An 1841 polemic, "On Distinguishing Barbarians", was based on the Qing sign "Vietnamese Barbarians' Hostel" (越夷會館) on the Fujian residence of Nguyen diplomat and Hoa Chinese Lý Văn Phức. It argued that the Qing did not subscribe to the neo-Confucianist texts from the Song and Ming dynasties which were learned by the Vietnamese, who saw themselves as sharing a civilization with the Qing. This event triggered a diplomatic disaster. The consequence was that non-"Han Chinese highland tribes" and other non-Vietnamese peoples living near (or in) Vietnam were called "barbarian" by the Vietnamese imperial court. The essay distinguishes the Yi and Hua, and mentions Zhao Tuo, Wen, Shun and Taibo. Kelley and Woodside described Vietnam's Confucianism.

Emperors Minh Mạng, Thiệu Trị and Tự Đức, were opposed to French involvement in Vietnam, and tried to reduce the country's growing Catholic community. The imprisonment of missionaries who had illegally entered the country was the primary pretext for the French to invade (and occupy) Indochina. Like Qing China, a number of incidents involved other European nations during the 19th century.

=== Religion ===
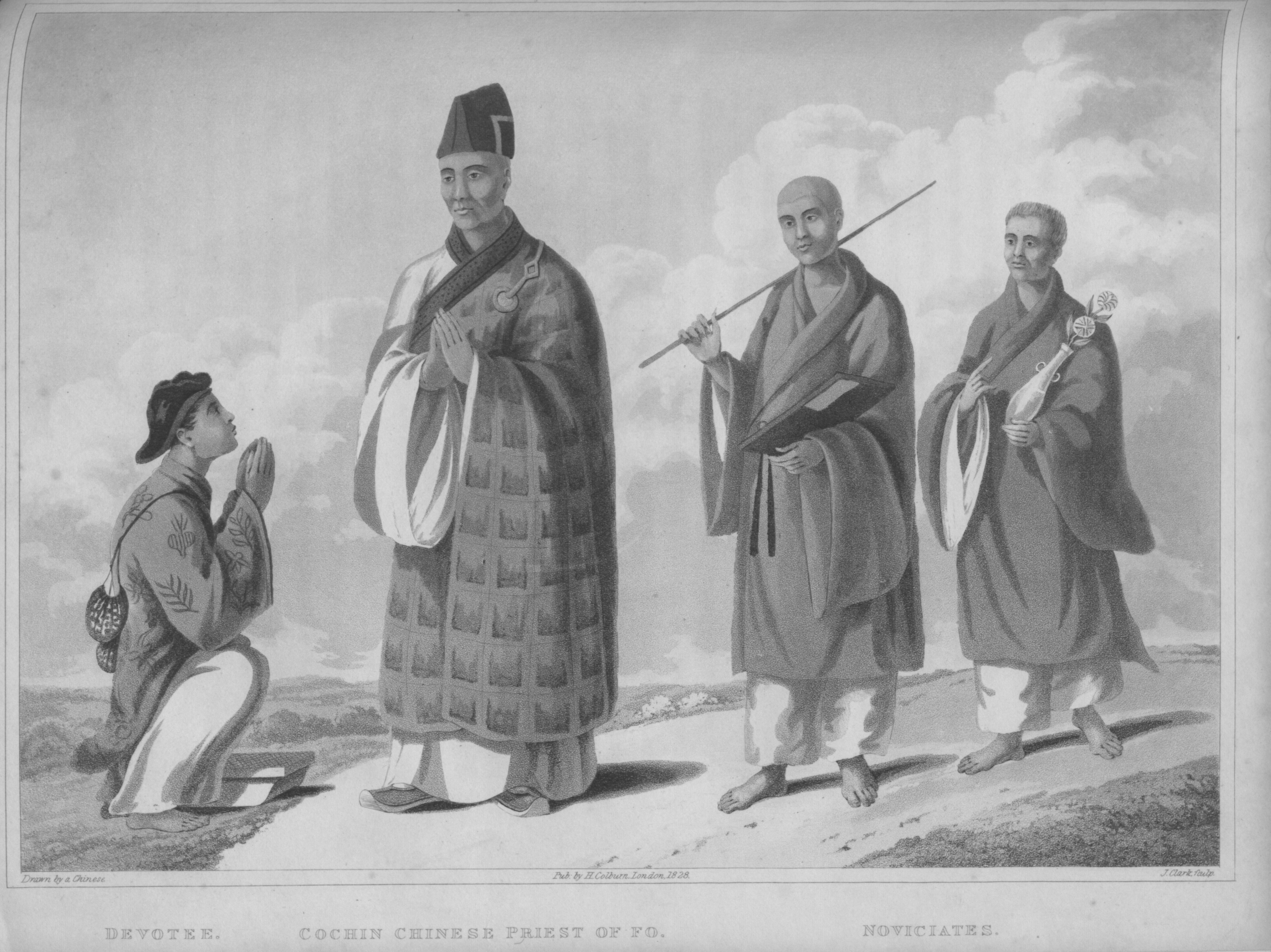
Buddhist monks in South Vietnam, 1828

Although the previous Nguyễn lords were faithful Buddhists, Gia Long was not a Buddhist. He adopted Neo-Confucianism and actively restricted Buddhism. Scholars, elites, and officials attacked Buddhist doctrines and criticized them as superstitious and useless. The third emperor, Thiệu Trị, elevated Confucianism as the true religion and while regarding Buddhism as superstition.

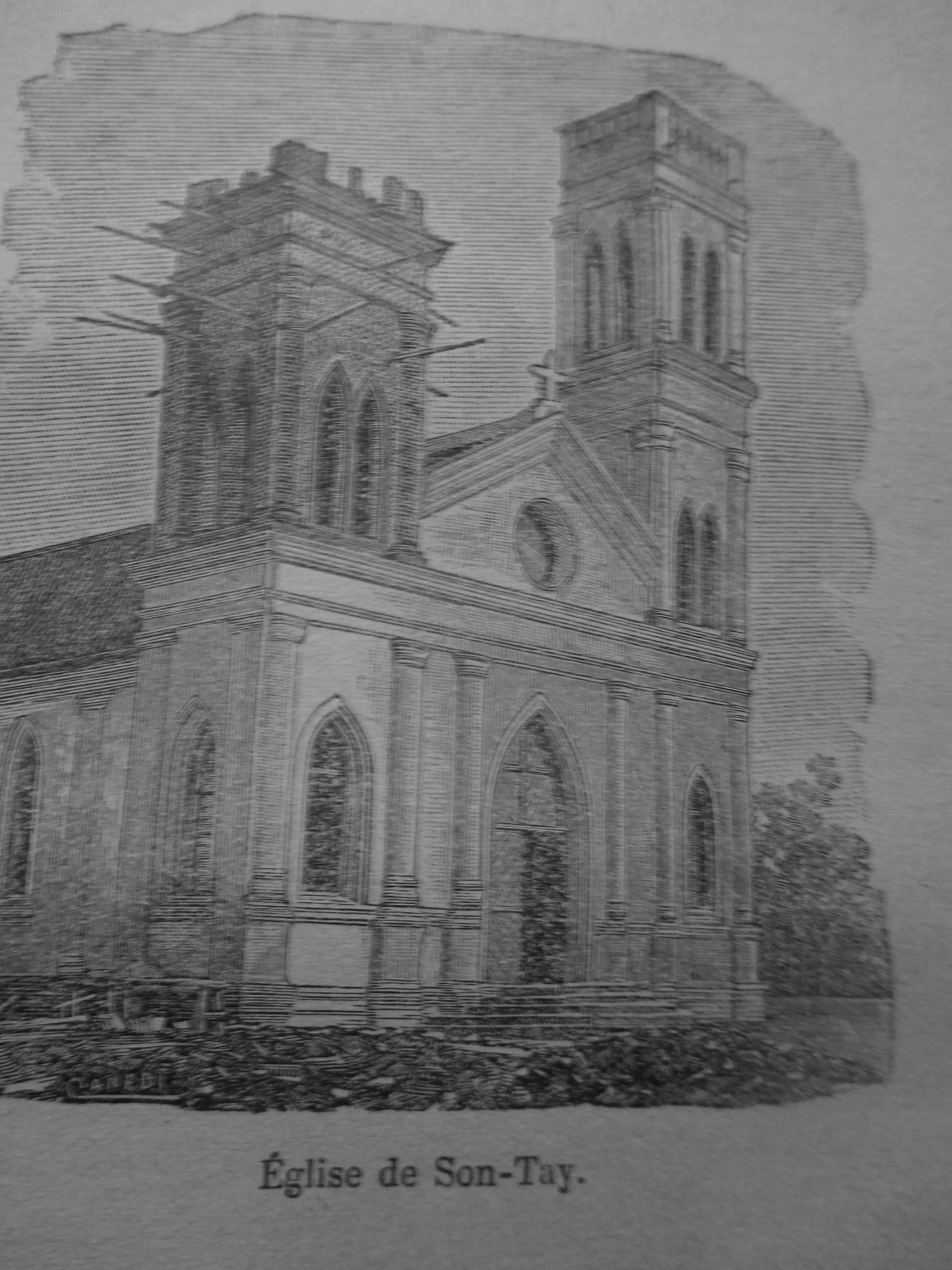
Church of Sơn Tây in 1884.

Building new Buddhist pagodas and temples were forbidden. Buddhist clergies and nuns were forced to join public works to limit the influence of Buddhism and promote Confucianism as the sole dominant belief of the society. However, such embracing a Sinic Confucian culture among the Vietnamese populace whom lived amidst a Southeast Asian infrastructure, widening the distance between the population and the court far away. Buddhism was still prevalent in mainstream society and had its presence within the imperial palace. Empress mothers, queens, princess, and concubines were devout Buddhists, despite the patriarchal prohibition.

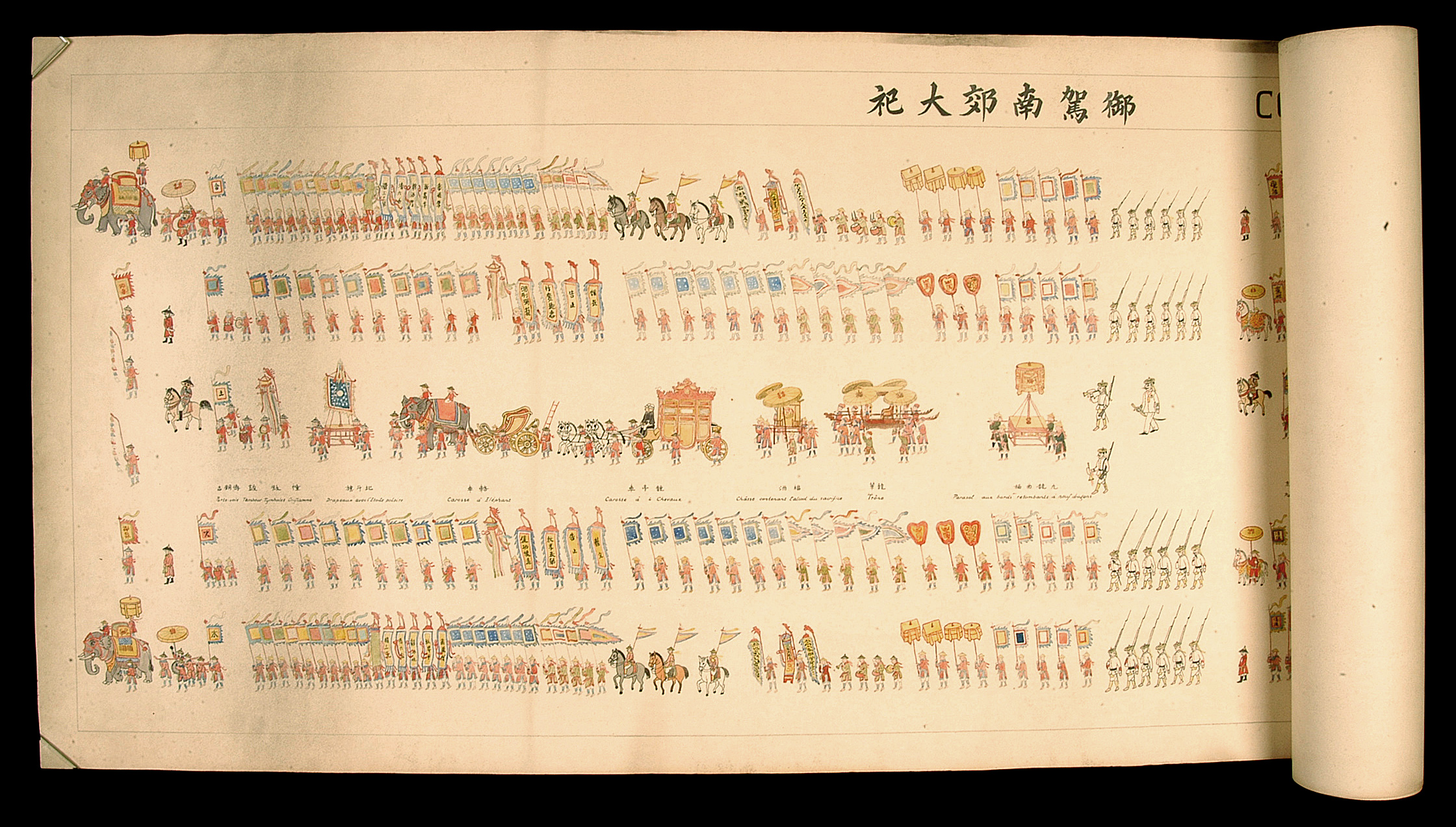
The panorama of Nam Giao procession

Confucianism itself was the ideology of the Nguyen court, also provided the basic core of classical education and civil examination every year. Gia Long pursued Confucianism to create and maintain a conservative society and social structures. Confucian rituals and ideas were circulations based within ancient Confucian teaching such as The Analects and Spring and Autumn Annals in Vietnamese-script collections. The court rigidly imported these Chinese books from Chinese merchants. Confucian rituals such as cầu đảo (offering heaven for wind and rain during a drought) that the emperor and court officials perform for wishing heaven to rain down his kingdom. If the offer went successful, they had to conduct lễ tạ (thanksgiving ritual) to heaven. In addition, the emperor believed that holy spirits and natural goddesses of his country can also make rain. In 1804, Gia Long built the Nam Hải Long Vương Temple (Temple of Southern Ocean Dragon King) in Thuận An, northeast of Hue in his faithfulness to the god of Thuận An (Thần Thuận An), the place where most of cầu đảo ritual was performed. His successor, Minh Mạng, continued to build several temples dedicated to the Vũ Sư (Rainmaking god) and altars for Thần Mây (Cloud God) and Thần Sấm (Thunder God).

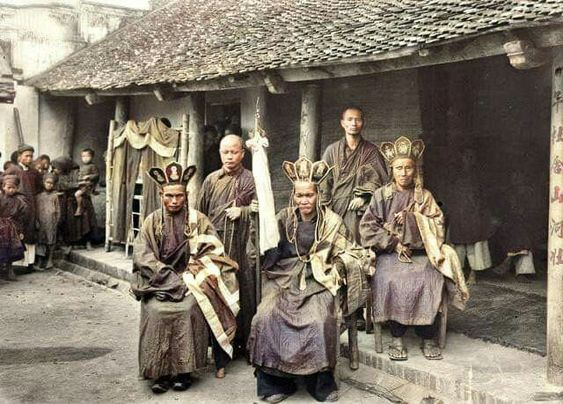
Vietnamese Buddhist monks in Hanoi

Nguyễn Trường Tộ, a prominent Catholic and reformist intellectual, launched an attack on Confucian structures in 1867 as decadent. He wrote to Tự Đức: "the evil that has been brought on China and on our country by the Confucian way of life." He criticized the court's Confucian education as dogmatic and unrealistic, promoted for his education reform.

During Gia Long's years, Catholicism was peacefully worshipped without any restriction. Began with Minh Mạng, who considered Christianity as a heterodox religion for its rejection of ancestor worship, the important belief of the Vietnamese monarchy. After reading the Bible (Old and New Testament), he considered the Christian religion irrational and ridiculous, and praised Tokugawa Japan for its notorious policies on Christians. Minh Mạng also was influenced by anti-Christian propaganda written by Vietnamese Confucian officials and literati, which described the mixing of men and women and liberal society among the Church. The most thing he worried about Christianity and Catholicism was writing texts that proved that Christianity was a means for Europeans to take over foreign countries. He also praised the anti-Christian policy in Japan. Churches were destroyed and many Christians were imprisoned. The persecution got intense during the reign of his grandson Tự Đức, when most of the state efforts were to annihilate Vietnamese Christianity, although even during the height of the anti-Catholic campaign, many Catholic scholars were still permitted to hold high positions in the imperial court.

After an imperial edict in late 1862, Catholicism was officially recognized and worshipers of the faith obtained state protection. It is estimated that late-19th century Vietnam had about 600,000 to 700,000 Catholic Christians.

=== Demography ===
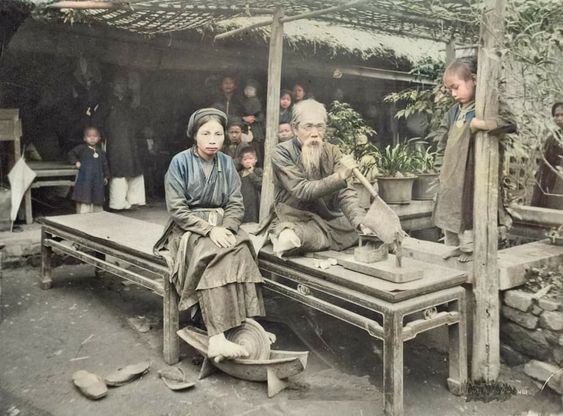
Traditional Pharmacy in Tonkin, Vietnam

Before the French conquest, the Vietnamese population was very sparse due to the agricultural backbones economy of the country. The population in 1802 was 6.5 million people and had only grown to 8 million by 1840. Rapid industrialization after the 1860s ushered in massive population growth and rapid urbanization in the late 19th century. Many peasants left tenant farms and poured into cities, they were hired by French-owned factories. By 1880 the Vietnamese were estimated back then as high as 18 million people, while modern estimates by Angus Maddison have suggested a lower figure of 12.2 million people. Vietnam under the Nguyễn dynasty was always a multiethnic complex. Nearly 80% percent of the Empire's population were ethnic Vietnamese (called Annamites then), whom language belonged to the Mon-Khmer (Mon–Annamite then) family, and the rest were Cham, Chinese, Khmer, Mường, Tày (called Thô then), and other 50 ethnic minorities such as the Mang, Jarai, Yao.

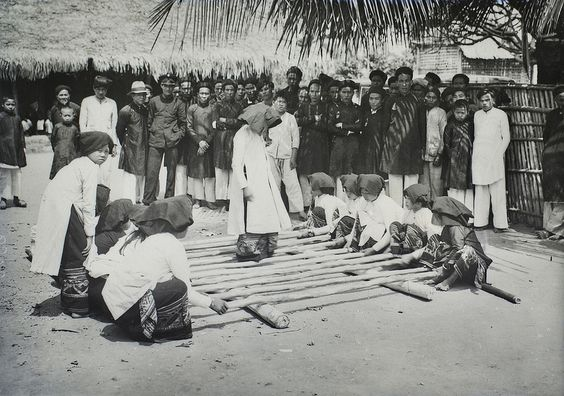
Children playing a traditional game in Quỳ Châu, Nghệ An province, 1920

The Annamites are distributed across the lowland of the country from Tonkin to Cochichina. The Chams live in central Vietnam and the Mekong Delta. The Chinese particularly concentrated in urbanised areas such as Saigon, Chợ Lớn, and Hanoi. The Chinese tended to be divided into two groups called Minh Hương (明鄉) and Thanh nhân (清人). The Minh Hương were Chinese refugees that had migrated and settled down in Vietnam earlier during the 17th century, who married with Vietnamese women, had been substantially assimilated to local Vietnamese and Khmer populaces, and loyal to the Nguyen, compared to the Thanh nhân that recently arrived in Southern Vietnam, dominated the rice trade. During the reign of Minh Mạng, a restriction against the Thanh nhân was issued in 1827, Thanh nhân could not access to the state bureaucracy and had to be integrated into Vietnamese population like the Minh Hương.

The Mường people inhabited the hills west of the Red River Delta, and although subordinate to the central authority, they were permitted to bear arms, a privilege not accorded to any other subjects of the court of Huế. The Tày and the Mang live in the northern highlands of Tonkin, both submitted to Huế court along with taxes and tribute, but were allowed to have their hereditary chiefs.

=== Photography ===
The first photographs of Vietnam were taken by Jules Itier in Danang, in 1845. The first photos of the Vietnamese were taken by Fedor Jagor in November 1857 in Singapore. Due to the forbidden contact to foreigners, photography returned to Vietnam again during the French conquest and had shots taken by Paul Berranger during the French invasion of Da Nang (September 1858). Since the French seizure of Saigon in 1859, the city and southern Vietnam had been opening to foreigners, and photography entered Vietnam exclusively from France and Europe.

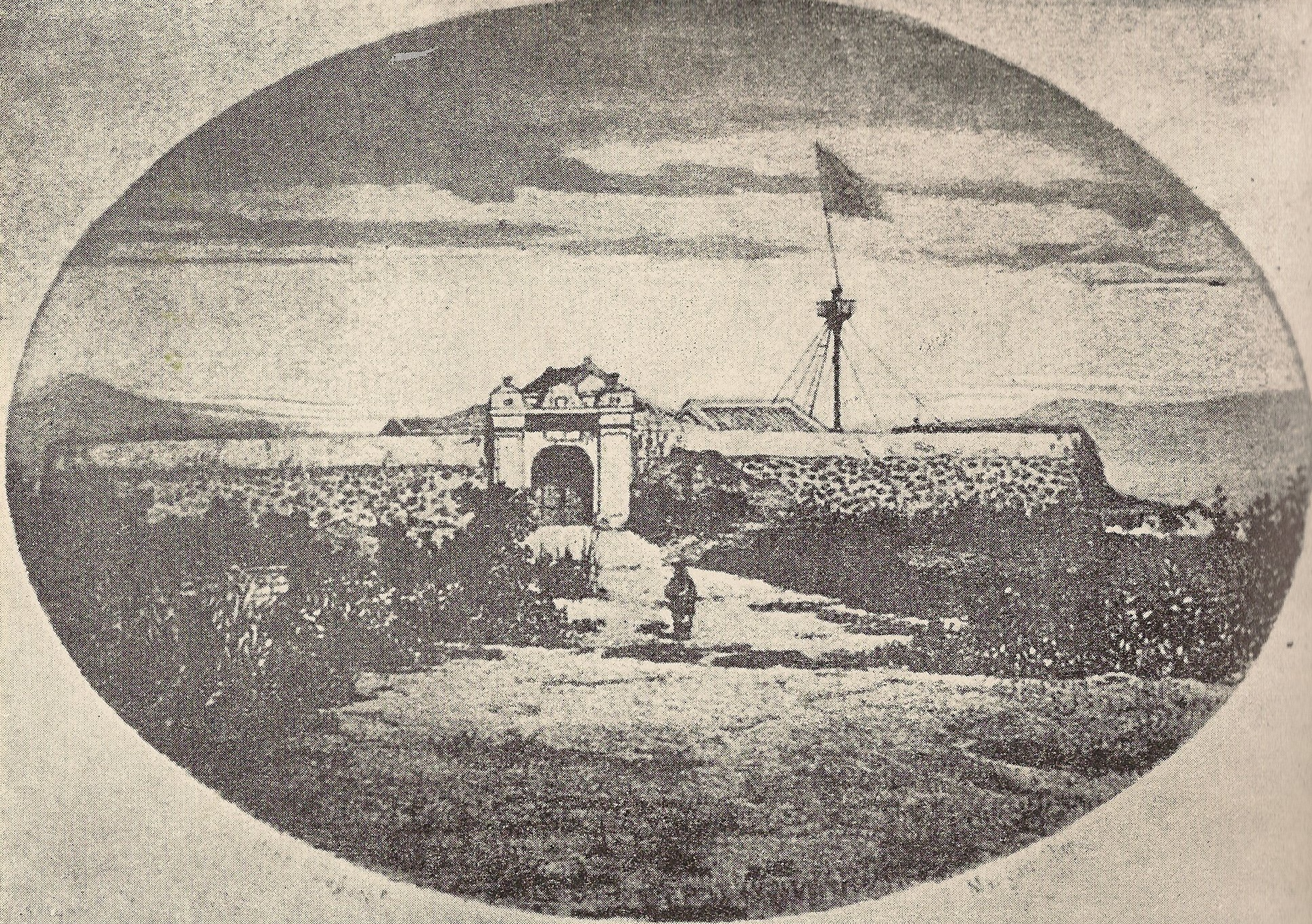
Early photograph of Fortress of Danang in 1845

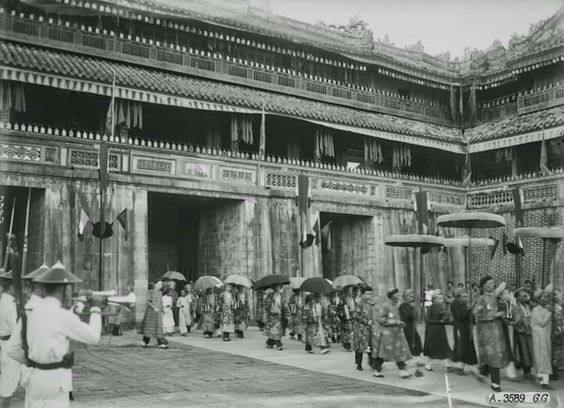
The Nobility leaving the Imperial Citiadel.

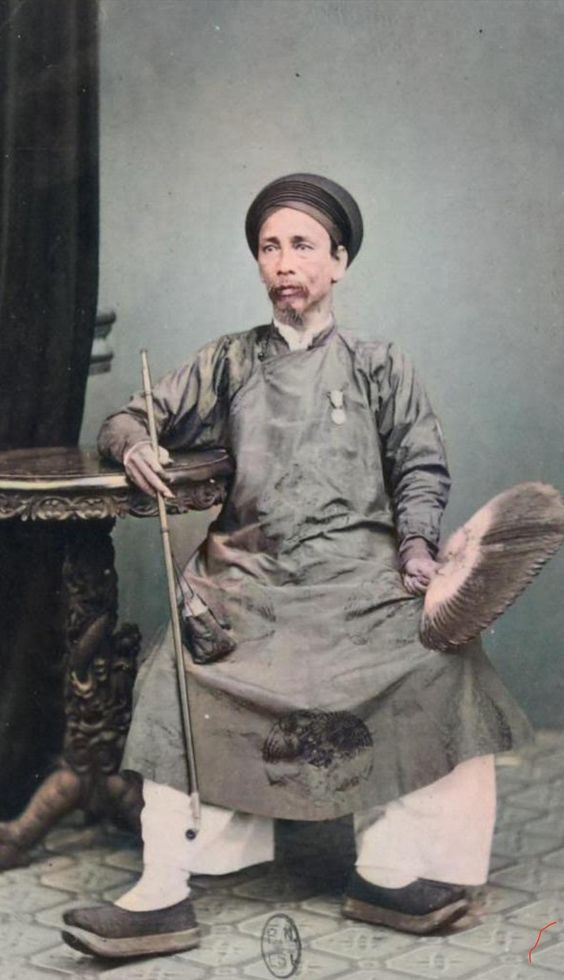
A Vietnamese noble posed for the photograph.

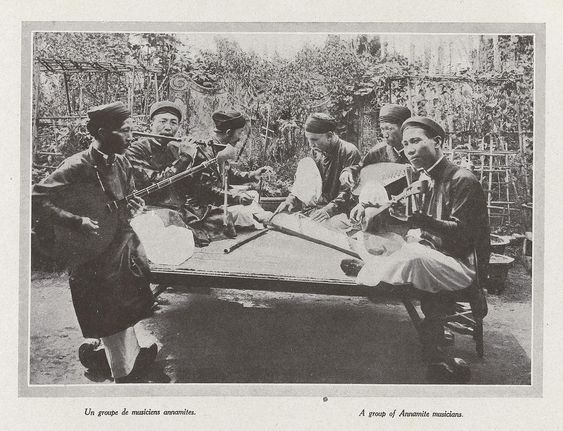
Group of musicians in Huế, 1919. They are sitting on a sập.

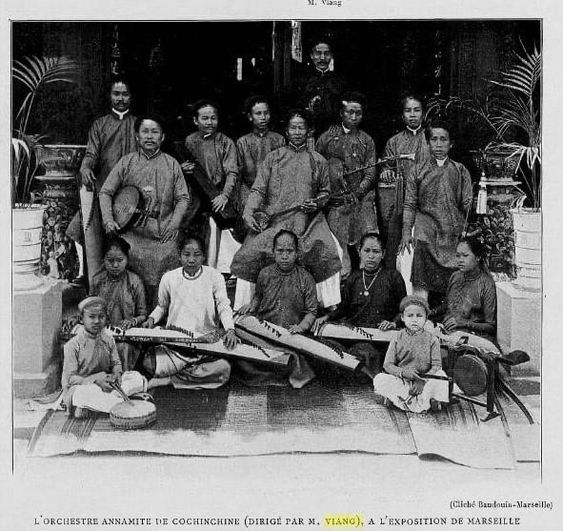
Group of female musicians from Cochinchina to perform in the colonial exposition in Marseille, 1922

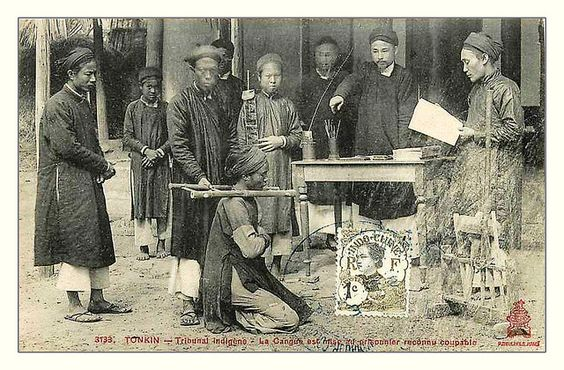
Judge and offender in the local trial.

== Gallery ==
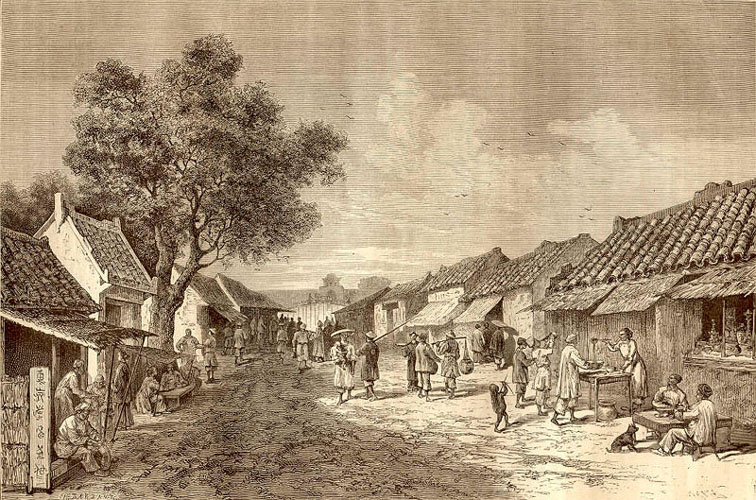
Huế city drawing in 1875

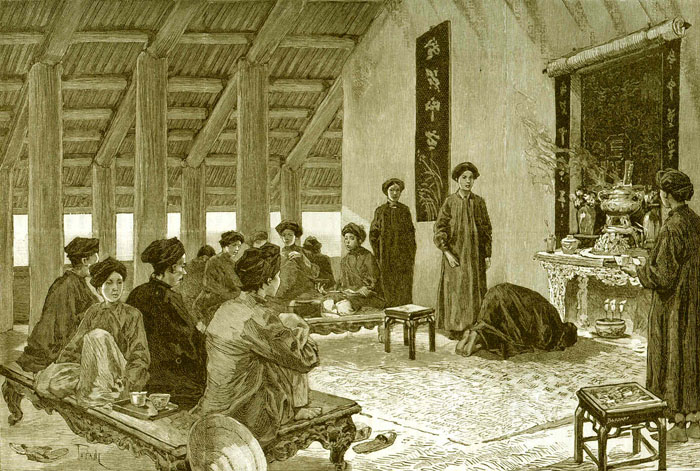
1884 drawing of a marriage ceremony in Tonkin

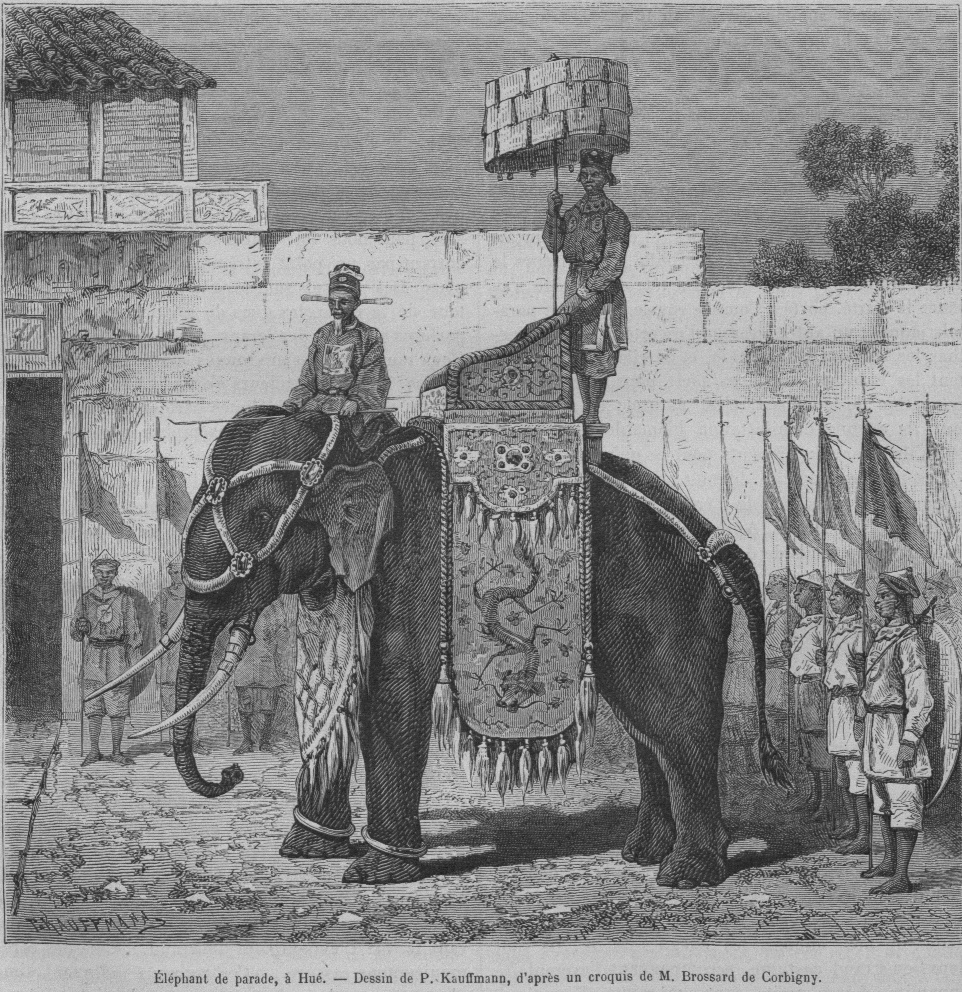
Elephant parade in Huế

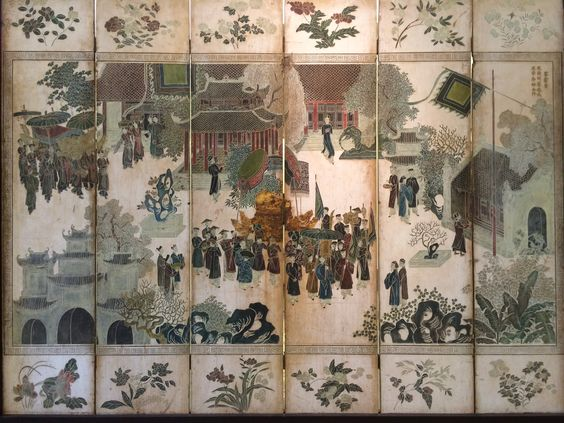
Tết new year holiday in temple Vietnam

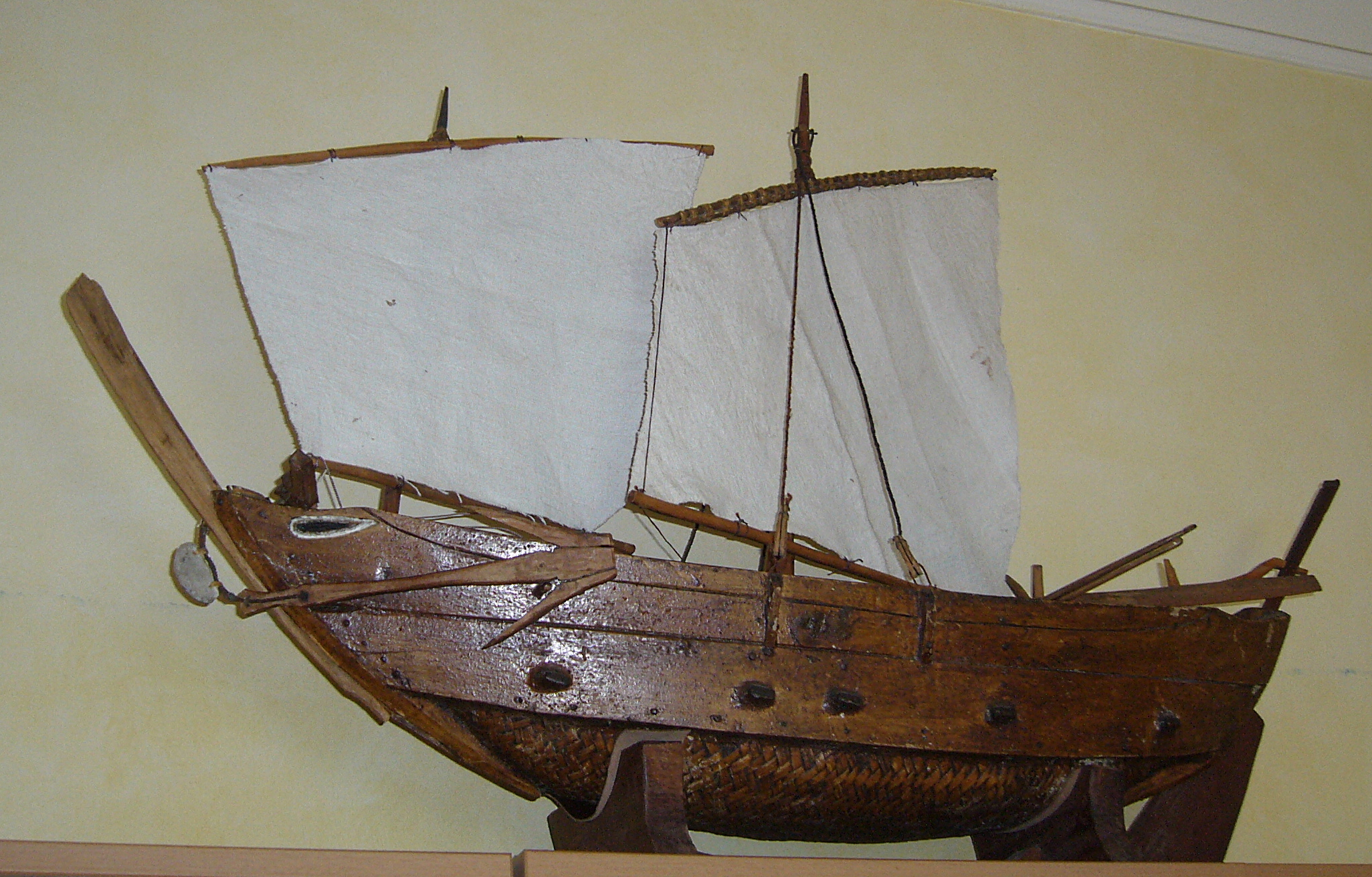
Model of a traditional ship in central Vietnam

== Imperial family ==
Imperial family of the Nguyễn dynasty
- Country: Nam Hà / Đàng Trong; Nguyễn dynasty French protectorates of Annam and Tonkin; Empire of Vietnam; State of Vietnam
- Founded: 1558
- Final ruler: Bảo Đại
- Titles: Lord of Quảng Nam; Emperor of Đại Việt; Emperor of Vietnam; Emperor of Đại Nam; Emperor of Vietnam
- Traditions: Buddhism, Confucianism and Catholicism
- Deposition: 1777 (Tây Sơn Rebellion); 1945 (Abdication of Bảo Đại) (Note: Bảo Đại was fully removed from Vietnamese politics following a referendum in 1955.); 1955 State of Vietnam referendum
- Cadet branches: Tôn Thất

The House of Nguyễn Phúc (Nguyen Gia Mieu) had historically been founded in the 14th century in Gia Miêu village, King Nguyen origins from the 15th century was from Nguyen Dinh Xi. Thanh Hóa Province, before they came to rule southern Vietnam from 1558 to 1777 and 1780 to 1802, then became the ruling dynasty of the entire Vietnam. Traditionally, the family traces themselves to Nguyễn Bặc (924–79), a duke and general during the Đinh dynasty from Gia Viễn, Ninh Bình. Princes and male descendants of Gia Long are called Hoàng Thân, while male lineal descendants of previous Nguyen lords are named Tôn Thất. Grandsons of the emperor were Hoàng tôn. Daughters of the emperor were called Hoàng nữ, and always earned the title công chúa (princess).

Their succession practically is according to the law of primogeniture, but sometimes conflicted. The first succession conflict arose in 1816 when Gia Long was designing for an heir. His first prince Nguyễn Phúc Cảnh died in 1802. As a result, two rival factions emerged, one support Nguyễn Phúc Mỹ Đường, the eldest son of Prince Cảnh, as the crown prince, while other support Prince Đảm (later Minh Mang). The second conflict was the 1847 succession when two young princes Nguyễn Phúc Hồng Bảo and Hồng Nhậm were dragged by the ill-failing Emperor Thiệu Trị as a potential heir. At first, Thiệu Trị apparently chose Prince Hồng Bảo because he was older, but after hearing advice from two regents Trương Đăng Quế and Nguyễn Tri Phương, he revised the heir at last minute and choose Hồng Nhậm as the crown prince.

=== Emperors ===
The following list is the emperors' era names, which have meaning in Chinese and Vietnamese. For example, the first ruler's era name, Gia Long, is the combination of the old names for Saigon (Gia Định) and Hanoi (Thăng Long) to show the new unity of the country; the fourth, Tự Đức, means "Inheritance of Virtues"; the ninth, Đồng Khánh, means "Collective Celebration".

Portrait/Photo	Temple name	Posthumous name	Personal name	Lineage	Reign	Regnal name	Tomb	Events
Portrait of Gia Long	Thế Tổ	Khai Thiên Hoằng Đạo Lập Kỷ Thùy Thống Thần Văn Thánh Vũ Tuấn Đức Long Công Chí Nhân Đại Hiếu Cao Hoàng Đế	Nguyễn Phúc Ánh	Nguyễn lords	1802–20 (1)	Gia Long	Thiên Thọ lăng	Defeated the Tây Sơn and unified Vietnam.
Portrait of Minh Mang	Thánh Tổ	Thể Thiên Xương Vận Chí Hiếu Thuần Đức Văn Vũ Minh Đoán Sáng Thuật Đại Thành Hậu Trạch Phong Công Nhân Hoàng Đế	Nguyễn Phúc Đảm	Son	1820–41 (2)	Minh Mệnh (Minh Mạng)	Hiếu Lăng	Annexed Cambodia after the Siamese–Vietnamese War (1831–1834). Annexed Muang Phuan after the Lao rebellion. Suppressed the Lê Văn Khôi revolt. Annexed the remaining Panduranga kingdom after the Ja Thak Wa uprising, renamed the country Đại Nam (Great South), suppressed Christianity.
	Hiến Tổ	Thiệu Thiên Long Vận Chí Thiện Thuần Hiếu Khoan Minh Duệ Đoán Văn Trị Vũ Công Thánh Triết Chượng Chương Hoàng Đế	Nguyễn Phúc Miên Tông	Son	1841–47 (3)	Thiệu Trị	Xương Lăng	Carried out policies of isolationism. Pulling troops from Cambodia.
Portrait of Tự Đức	Dực Tông	Thể Thiên Hanh Vận Chí Thành Đạt Hiếu Thể Kiện Đôn Nhân Khiêm Cung Minh Lược Duệ Văn Anh Hoàng Đế	Nguyễn Phúc Hồng Nhậm	Son	1847–83 (4)	Tự Đức	Khiêm Lăng	Suppressed Đoàn Hữu Trưng's rebellion. Facing French invasions. Ceded Cochinchina to France after the Cochinchina campaign. Fought against French invasions of 1873 and 1882–1883.
Dục Đức's tomb	Cung Tông	Huệ Hoàng Đế	Nguyễn Phúc Ưng Chân	Nephew (adopted son of Tự Đức)	1883 (5)	Dục Đức	An Lăng	Three-day emperor (20–23 July 1883), deposed and poisoned by Tôn Thất Thuyết.
Portrait of Hiệp Hòa	–	Văn Lãng Quận Vương	Nguyễn Phúc Hồng Dật	Uncle (son of Thiệu Trị)	1883 (6)	Hiệp Hòa		Four-month emperor (30 July – 29 November 1883), poisoned by the order of Tôn Thất Thuyết.
Portrait of Kiến Phúc	Giản Tông	Thiệu Đức Chí Hiếu Uyên Duệ Nghị Hoàng Đế	Nguyễn Phúc Ưng Đăng	Nephew (son of Hiệp Hòa's brother)	1883–84 (7)	Kiến Phúc	Bồi Lăng (within Khiêm Lăng)	Eight-month emperor (2 December 1883 – 31 July 1884). Signing of the Treaty of Huế (1884).
Portrait of Hàm Nghi	–	—	Nguyễn Phúc Ưng Lịch	Younger brother	1884–85 (8)	Hàm Nghi	Thonac Cemetery, France	Resisting against French rule under the Cần Vương movement. Dethroned after one year, continuing his rebellion until captured in 1888 and exiled to French Algeria until his death in 1943.
Portrait of Đồng Khánh	Cảnh Tông	Hoằng Liệt Thống Thiết Mẫn Huệ Thuần Hoàng Đế	Nguyễn Phúc Ưng Kỷ	Older brother	1885–89 (9)	Đồng Khánh	Tư Lăng	Suppress Hàm Nghi's Cần Vương movement.
Portrait of Thành Thái	–	Hoài Trạch Công	Nguyễn Phúc Bửu Lân	Cousin (son of Dục Đức)	1889–1907 (10)	Thành Thái	An Lăng	Exiled to Réunion Island due to anti-French activities.
Portrait of Duy Tân	–	—	Nguyễn Phúc Vĩnh San	son	1907–16 (11)	Duy Tân	An Lăng	Rebelled against the French and exiled to Réunion Island in 1916.
Portrait of Khải Định	Hoằng Tông	Tự Đại Gia Vận Thánh Minh Thần Trí Nhân Hiếu Thành Kính Di Mô Thừa Liệt Tuyên Hoàng Đế	Nguyễn Phúc Bửu Đảo	Cousin (son of Đồng Khánh)	1916–25 (12)	Khải Định	Ứng Lăng	Collaborated with the French, and was a political figurehead for French colonial rulers. Unpopular to the Vietnamese people.
Portrait of Bảo Đại	—	—	Nguyễn Phúc Vĩnh Thụy	Son	1926–45 (13)	Bảo Đại	Cimetière de Passy, France	Head of the Empire of Vietnam under Japanese occupation during World War II; abdicated and transferred power to the Viet Minh in 1945, ending the Vietnamese monarchy. Installed as head of state of the State of Vietnam, ousted by Ngo Dinh Diem after the 1955 referendum.

After the death of Emperor Tự Đức (and according to his will), Dục Đức ascended to the throne on 19 July 1883. He was dethroned and imprisoned three days later, after being accused of deleting a paragraph from Tự Đức's will. With no time to announce his dynastic title, his era name was named for his residential palace.

=== Lineage ===
1 Gia Long; 1802–1819
2 Minh Mệnh; 1820–1840
3 Thiệu Trị; 1841–1847
4 Tự Đức; 1847–1883	Thoại Thái Vương	Kiên Thái Vương	6 Hiệp Hoà; 1883
5 Dục Đức; 1883	9 Đồng Khánh; 1885–1889	8 Hàm Nghi; 1884–1885	7 Kiến Phúc; 1883–1884
10; Thành Thái; 1889–1907	12; Khải Định; 1916–1925
11; Duy Tân; 1907–1916	13; Bảo Đại; 1926–1945

Note:

- Years are reigning years.

=== Family tree ===
Simplified family tree of the Nguyen Phuc dynasty:

- – Lords of Đàng Trong (1550s–1777)
- – Emperors of the independent Vietnamese monarchy (1802–1883)
- – Emperors of French Annam and Tonkin/Emperor of Empire of Vietnam (1885–1945)

Nguyễn Phúc family tree

Nguyễn Công Duẩn
Nguyễn Văn Lỗ
Nguyễn Văn Lang
Nguyễn Hoằng Dụ
Nguyễn Kim
Nguyễn Hoàng	Nguyễn Uông	Nguyễn Thị Ngọc Bảo
Nguyễn Phúc Nguyên
Nguyễn Phúc Lan
Nguyễn Phúc Tần
Nguyễn Phúc Thái
Nguyễn Phúc Chu
Nguyễn Phúc Trú
Nguyễn Phúc Khoát
Nguyễn Phúc Luân	Nguyễn Phúc Hiệu	Nguyễn Phúc Thuần
Gia Long (1) r. 1802–20	Nguyễn Phúc Dương
Nguyễn Phúc Cảnh	Minh Mạng (2) r. 1820–41
Nguyễn Phúc Mỹ Đường	Nguyễn Phúc Miên Thẩm	Nguyễn Phúc Miên Định	Thiệu Trị (3) r. 1841–47	Nguyễn Phúc Miên Bửu
Nguyễn Phúc Tăng Du	Nguyễn Phúc Hồng Bảo	Nguyễn Phúc Hồng Y	Tự Đức (4) r. 1848–83	Hiệp Hòa (6) r. August–December 1883	Nguyễn Phúc Hồng Cai
Cường Để	Dục Đức (5) r. 20–23 July 1883	Đồng Khánh (9) r. 1885–89	Kiến Phúc (7) r. December 1883 – July 1884	Hàm Nghi (8) r. July 1884–85
Thành Thái(10) r. 1889–1907	Khải Định (12) r. 1916–25
Duy Tân (11) r. 1907–16	Bảo Đại (13) r. 1925–45
Bảo Ngọc (Georges Vĩnh San) (b. 1933)	Bảo Long (1934–2007)	Bảo Thăng (1944–2017)

=== Succession line ===
- Thiệu Trị (1801–1847)
  - Tự Đức (1829–1883)
  - Kiên Thái Vương (1845–1876)
    - Đồng Khánh (1864–1889)
      - Khải Định (1885–1925)
        - Bảo Đại (1913–1997)
          - Crown Prince Bảo Long (1936–2007)
          - Prince Bảo Thăng (1943–2017)
    - Kiến Phúc (1869–1884)
    - Hàm Nghi (1871–1944)
      - Prince Minh Đức (1910–1990)

== Symbols ==
=== Flags ===
The Nguyễn dynasty's national flag or the Imperial flag first appeared during the reign of Emperor Gia Long. It was a yellow flag with a single or three horizontal red stripes, sometimes in 1822, it was entirely blank yellow or white. The emperor's personal flag was a golden dragon spitting fire, surrounded by clouds, a silver moon, and a black crescent on a yellow background.

=== Seals ===
The Nguyễn dynasty's seal are rich and diverse in types and had strict rules and laws that regulated their manipulation, management, and use. The common practice of using seals was clearly recorded in the book "Khâm định Đại Nam hội điển sự lệ" on how to use seals, how to place them, and on what kinds of documents, which was compiled by the Cabinet of the Nguyễn dynasty in the year Minh Mạng 3 (1822). The various types of seals of the Nguyễn dynasty had different names based on their function, namely Bảo (寶), Tỷ (璽), Ấn (印), Chương (章), Ấn chương (印章), Kim bảo tỷ (金寶璽), Quan phòng (關防), Đồ ký (圖記), Kiềm ký (鈐記), Tín ký (信記), Ấn Ký (印記), Trưởng ký (長記), and Ký (記).

Seals in the Nguyễn dynasty were overseen by a pair of agencies referred to as the Office of Ministry Seals Management – Officers on Duty (印司 – 直處, Ấn ty – Trực xứ), this is a term that refers to two agencies which were established within each of the Six Ministries, these agencies were tasked with keeping track of the seals, files, and chapters of their ministry. On duty of the Office of Ministry Seals Management were the correspondents of each individual ministry that received and distributed documents and records of a government agency. These two agencies usually had a few dozen officers who would import documents from their ministry. Usually the name of the ministry is directly attached to the seal agency's name, for example "Office of Civil Affairs Ministry Seals Management – Civil Affairs Ministry Officers on Duty" (吏印司吏直處, Lại Ấn ty Lại Trực xứ).

Since the Nguyễn dynasty period seals have a fairly uniform shape (with or without a handle), the uniform description of these seals in Vietnamese are:

- Thân ấn – The geometric block, or body, of the seal.
- Núm ấn – The handle for pressing the seal down on texts. In case the seal is shaped like a pyramid, there is no knob.
- Mặt ấn – Where the main content of the seal (symbol or word) is engraved, this area is usually in the face down position. The stamp surface is often used up to engrave letters or drawings.
- Lưng ấn – The face of the seal, where other information about the seal is engraved, usually in the supine position. In the case of the flat-head pyramid seal (ấn triện hình tháp đầu bằng), the flat head is the back.
- Hình ấn – A word used to indicate the impression of the seal on a text.

Seals were also given to people after they received a noble title. For example, after Léon Louis Sogny received the title of "Baron of An Bình" (安平男) in the year Bảo Đại 14 (保大拾肆年, 1939) he was also given a golden seal and a Kim Bài (金牌) with his noble title on it. The seal had the seal script inscription An Bình Nam chi ấn (安平男之印).

In its 143 years of existence, the government of the Nguyễn dynasty had created more than 100 imperial seals. These imperial seals were made of jade, bronze, silver, gold, ivory, and meteorite.

=== Sun, moon, auspicious clouds, and the Yin-Yang symbol ===
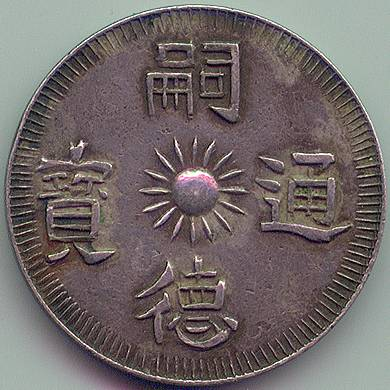
A silver Tự Đức Thông Bảo (嗣德通寶) coin depicting an imperial sun symbol.

Like Imperial China and Royal Korea, the Vietnamese used the sun as the "Symbol of the Empire" and auspicious clouds and the Taijitu as "Symbols of the State". The heraldic systems of both the Later Lê and Nguyễn dynasties were similar to those found in China during the Ming and Qing dynasties. The sun symbol as a flaming disc in Vietnam dates back to the 11th century and during the Nguyễn dynasty period this symbol was often depicted with pointed rays. The moon symbolised the state, the sun the empire, stars the sovereigns, and clouds the heaven.

The "Achievement of the Empire" and the "Achievement of the State" were identical to their Imperial Chinese counterparts, the "Achievement of the Empire" first appeared in Vietnam during the 11th century and were identical during the Later Lê and Nguyễn periods consisting of two Dragons surrounding a flaming sun, while the "Achievement of the State" is known to have been used as early as the Trần dynasty period and this early Trần version consists of two Dragons surrounding a lotus flower (a symbol of Buddhism). During the Nguyễn dynasty period the "Achievement of the State" typically consisted of two dragons surrounding a moon or two dragons surrounding a Taijitu, this symbol was commonly found on the caps of high-ranking mandarins. The two dragons surrounding the moon implies that the emperor, or "sovereign", (represented by the dragons) was also the head of state (represented by either the moon or a Yin-Yang symbol). During the period of French domination (法屬, Pháp thuộc) these symbols could be interpreted as the French National Assembly (that is: the French people) was the sovereign over the Empire (the dragons), the Nguyễn Emperor now merely being the head of state (moon or Yin-Yang symbol). Moons also appeared on the shields of common Nguyễn dynasty soldiers representing the state, while soldiers of the imperial guards sometimes had shields depicting a red sun showcasing that they were a function of the empire.

=== Dragons ===
Dragon motifs appeared on many state symbols during the Nguyễn dynasty period including on imperial edicts, coins, buildings, and the badges of the Imperial Guard. During the Minh Mạng period (1820–1841) dragons on silver Tiền coins were often depicted facing dexter (to the right), while during the Thiệu Trị period (1841–1847) and later these coins depicted dragons guardant (facing forward). Dragons were considered to be one of the four sacred animals together with the Phượng hoàng (Phoenix), Kỳ lân (Unicorn), and the Linh quy (Sacred turtle). During the Nguyễn dynasty period the depiction of dragons in Vietnamese art reached their zenith and the quality and variety of Nguyễn dynasty dragons was much higher than those of earlier dynasties.

In the third month of the year Bính Tý, or Gia Long 15 (1816), Emperor Gia Long instructed the court to create special clothes, hats, and seals for himself and the crown prince to denote independence from China. These regalia all depicted five-clawed dragons (蠪𠄼𤔻, rồng 5 móng), in Chinese symbolism (including Vietnamese symbolism) five-clawed dragons are symbols of an Emperor, while four-clawed dragons are seen as symbols or kings. To denote the high status of Emperor all monarchial robes, hats, and seals were adorned with five-clawed dragons and ordered the creation of new seals with five-clawed dragons as their seal knobs to showcase imperial legitimacy. Meanwhile, the wardrobes and other symbols of vassals and princes were adorned with four-clawed dragons symbolising their status as "kings".

The two national coats of arms of the French protectorate of Annam would also consist of golden dragons with one being a sword per fess charged with a scroll inscribed with two Traditional Chinese characters Đại Nam (大南) and supported by a single Vietnamese dragon and the other being a golden five-clawed dragon positioned affronté.

=== Gallery of symbols ===
Flag of Nguyễn period Vietnam.

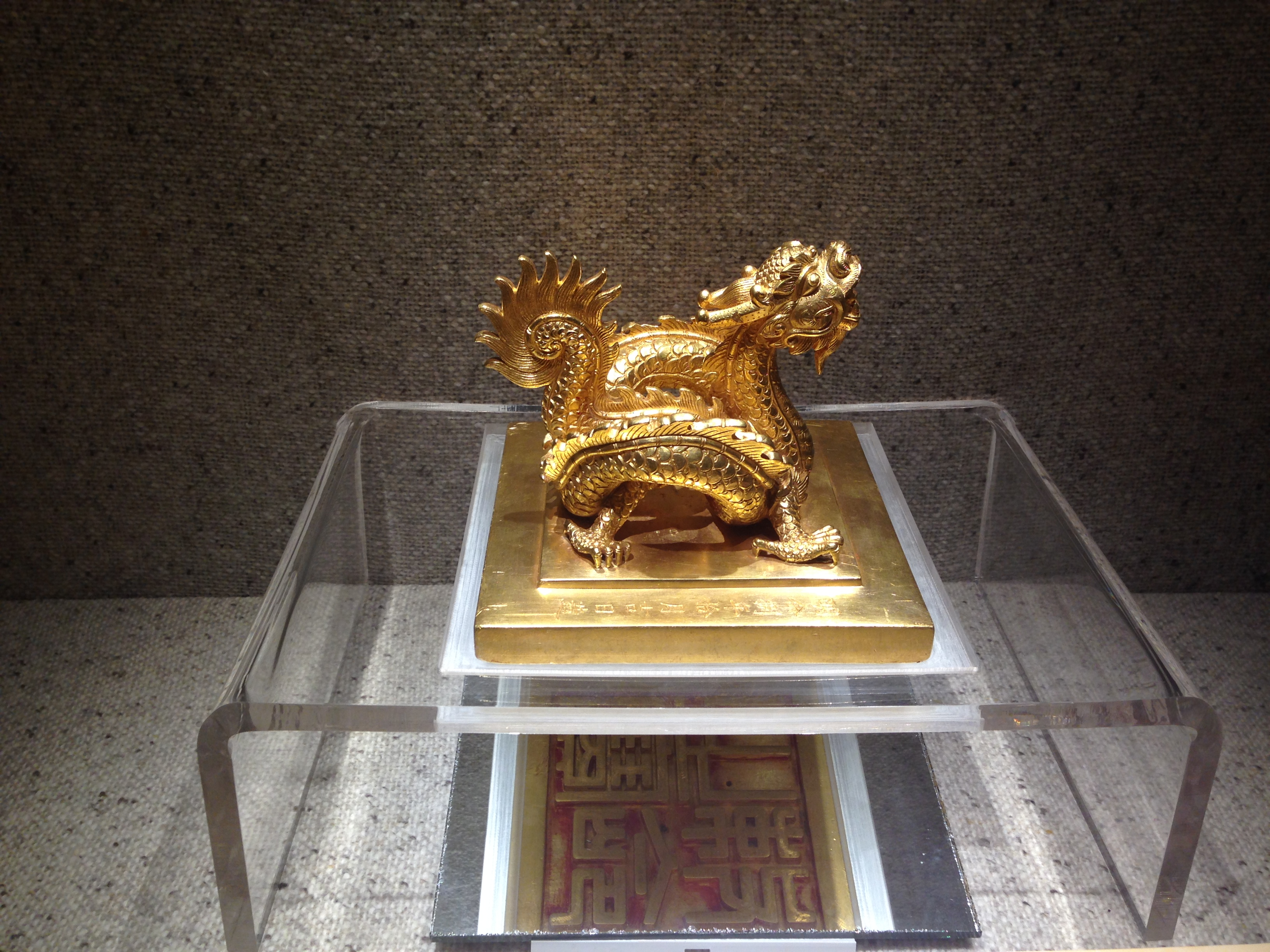
An Imperial seal made during the Minh Mạng period.

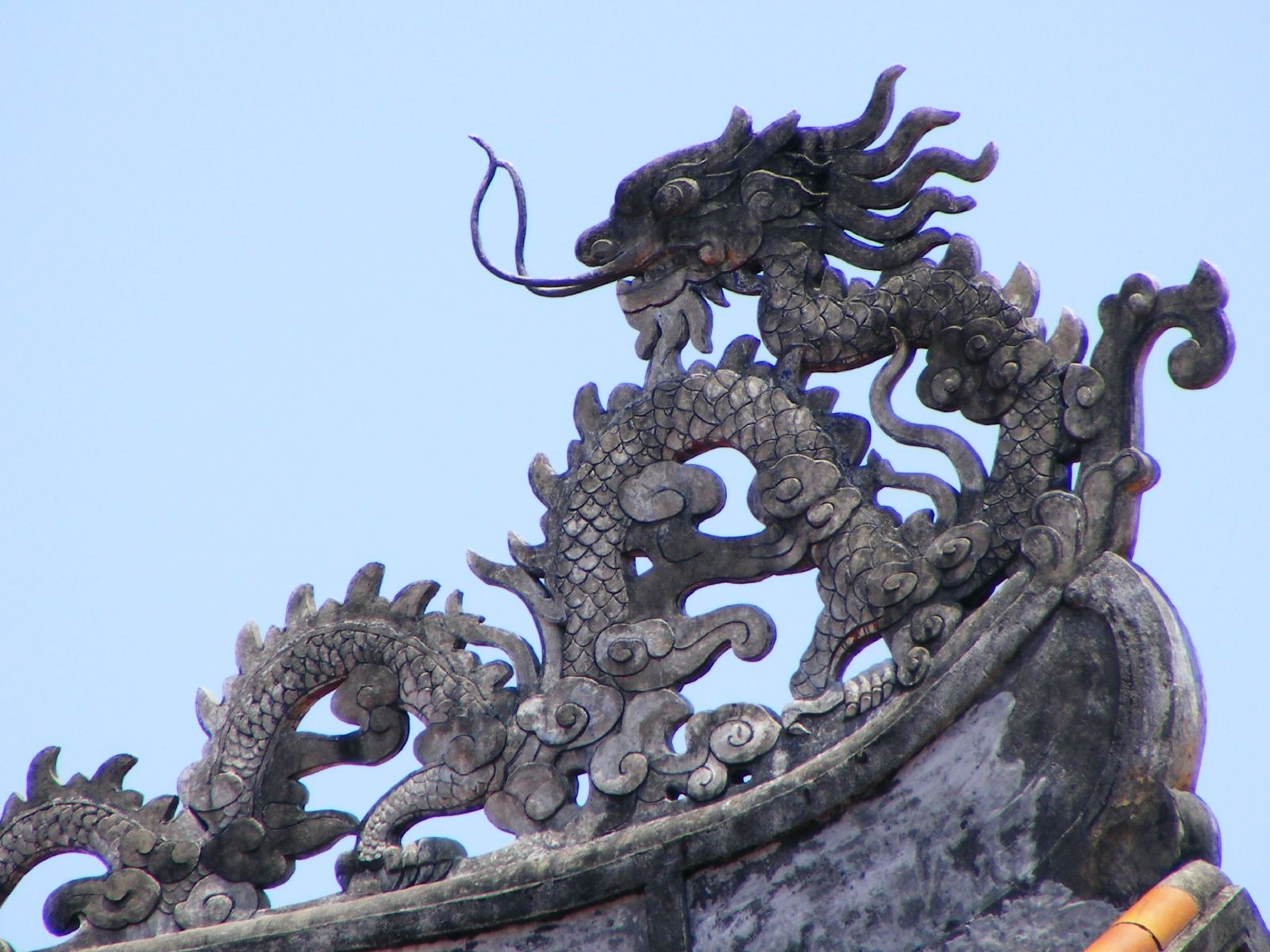
Dragon motifs are found everywhere in imperial buildings.

== See also ==
- List of monarchs of Vietnam
- Nguyễn Trường Tộ – served Emperor Tự Đức
- Hà Ngại, official of the dynasty

== Sources ==
=== Books ===
- Amirell, Stefan E. (2019), Pirates of Empire Colonisation and Maritime Violence in Southeast Asia, Cambridge University Press, ISBN 978-1-108-63682-7
- Avakov, Alexander V. (2015), Two Thousand Years of Economic Statistics, Years 1–2012 Population, GDP at PPP, and GDP Per Capita. Volume 1, By Rank, Algora Publishing, ISBN 978-1-62894-101-2
- Balfour, Francis (1884). The Works of Francis Maitland Balfour: Volume 3.
- Bennett, Terry (2020). Early Photography in Vietnam. Renaissance Books. ISBN 978-19129-6-104-7.
- Bradley, Camp Davis (2016). Imperial Bandits: Outlaws and Rebels in the China-Vietnam Borderlands. Seattle and London: University of Washington Press. ISBN 978-0-295-74205-2.
- Đặng Việt Thủy; Đặng Thành Trung (2008). 54 vị Hoàng đế Việt Nam (in Vietnamese). Hà Nội: Nhà xuất bản Quân đội Nhân dân.
- Chandler, David (2018). A History of Cambodia (4 ed.). Routledge. ISBN 978-0429964060. Archived from the original on 4 January 2024.
- Chapuis, Oscar (2000). The Last Emperors of Vietnam: from Tu Duc to Bao Dai. Greenwood Press. ISBN 0-313-31170-6.
- Co, N. D. (2022). History of the formation of the Chinese community in Dong Nai, Vietnam in the 17th – 18th centuries. International Journal of Health Sciences, Vol. 6 (S6) pp. 4017–4029
- Choi, Byung Wook (2004a), Southern Vietnam Under the Reign of Minh Mạng (1820–1841): Central Policies and Local Response, SEAP Publications, ISBN 978-1-501-71952-3
- ——— (2004b), "The Nguyen dynasty's policy toward Chinese on the Water Frontier in the first half of the Nineteenth Century", in Nola, Cooke (ed.), The Water Frontier, Singapore University Press, pp. 85–99
- Dai Nam Thuc Luc chính biên (Veritable Records of Đại Nam) Annal 1, Vol 1, 1847. Alo published by Thuan Hoa Publishing House, 2006
- Dror, Olga (2007), Cult, Culture, and Authority : Princess Lieu Hanh in Vietnamese History, University of Hawaii Press, ISBN 978-0-8248-2972-8
- Dutton, George Edson (2006). The Tây Sơn uprising: society and rebellion in eighteenth-century Vietnam. University of Hawaii Press. ISBN 0-8248-2984-0.
- Everett, Edward (1841). The North American Review:Volume 52.
- Fukukawa Y. et al. (2006). Kiến trúc phố cổ Hội An – Việt Nam [Architecture of Hội An Ancient Town – Vietnam] (in Vietnamese). Hanoi: Nhà xuất bản Thế giới. Showa Women's University Institute of International Culture.
- Goscha, Christopher (2016). Vietnam: A New History. Basic Books. ISBN 978-0-46509-436-3.
- Heath, Ian (2003) [1998]. Armies of the Nineteenth Century: Burma and Indo-China. Foundry Books. ISBN 978-1-90154-306-3.
- Hiley, Richard (1848) [1843]. Progressive geography, adapted to junior classes. Oxford University.
- Holcombe, Charles (2017). A History of East Asia: From the Origins of Civilization to the Twenty-First Century. Cambridge University Press. ISBN 978-11071-1-873-7. Archived from the original on 4 January 2024.
- Huỳnh Minh (2006). Gia Định xưa. Nhà Xuất bản Văn hóa-Thông tin.
- Kamm, Henry (1996). Dragon Ascending: Vietnam and the Vietnamese. Arcade Publishing. ISBN 1559703067.
- Keane, A. H. (1896). Stanford's Compendium of Geography and Travel: Asia – Vol II: Southern and Western Asia. E. Stanford.
- Kiernan, Ben (2019) [2017]. Việt Nam: a history from earliest time to the present. Oxford University Press. ISBN 978-0-19005-379-6.
- Keith, Charlers (2012). Catholic Vietnam: A Church from Empire to Nation. University of California Press. ISBN 978-0-52027-247-7.
- Kollman (pub.) (1846). Sion. Eine Stimme in der Kirche für unsere Zeit. Eine rel. Zeitschrift ... eine Hausbibliothek für Geistliche und fromme katholische Familien. Hrsg. durch einen Verein von Katholiken u. red. von Thomas Wiser u. W. Reithmeier: Volume 28.
- Johnston, A. K. (1880). A School Physical and Descriptive Geography. Oxford University.
- ——— (1881). A Physical, Historical, Political, & Descriptive Geography. E. Stanford.
- Lieberman, Victor B. (2003). Strange Parallels: Southeast Asia in Global Context, c. 800–1830, volume 1, Integration on the Mainland. Cambridge University Press. ISBN 978-0-521-80496-7.
- Li, Tana (1994), "Rice Trade in the 18th and 19th Century Mekong Delta and Its Implication", in Aphornsuvan, Thanet (ed.), An International Seminar on Thailand and her neighbours: Laos, Vietnam and Cambodia, Thammasat University Press, pp. 198–213
- ——— (2002), Việt Nam học kỷ yếu Hội thảo quốc tế lần thứ nhất, Thế giới Publishing, pp. 141–150
- ——— (2004a), "The Water Frontier: In Introduction", in Nola, Cooke (ed.), The Water Frontier, Singapore University Press, pp. 1–20, ISBN 978-0-74253-082-9
- ——— (2004b), "The late 18th and early 19th-century Mekong Delta in the Regional Trade System", in Nola, Cooke (ed.), The Water Frontier, Singapore University Press, pp. 71–84
- ——— (2004c), "Ships and ship building in the Mekong delta, 1750–1840", in Nola, Cooke (ed.), The Water Frontier, Singapore University Press, pp. 119–135
- ——— (2018) [1998]. Nguyen Cochinchina: Southern Vietnam in the Seventeenth and Eighteenth Centuries. Cornell University Press.
- Marr, David G. (1981). Vietnamese Tradition on Trial, 1920–1945: Volume 10. University of California Press.
- McGregor, John (1834). The Resources and Statistics of Nations Exhibiting the Geographical Position and Natural Resources, the Area and Population, the Political Statistics ... of All Countries · Volume 2.
- McHale, Frederick (2008). Print and Power: Confucianism, Communism, and Buddhism in the Making of Modern Vietnam. Hawaii: University of Hawaii Press. ISBN 978-0-82484-304-5.
- McLeod, Mark W. (1991). The Vietnamese response to French intervention, 1862–1874. New York: Praeger. ISBN 0-275-93562-0.
- Mikaberidze, Alexander (2020). The Napoleonic Wars: A Global History. Oxford University Press. ISBN 978-0-199-39406-7.
- Miller, Robert (1990). United States and Vietnam 1787–1941. Washington, DC: National Defense University Press. ISBN 978-0-788-10810-5.
- Momoki, Shiro (2015), "The Vietnamese empire and its expansion, c. 980–1840", in Wade, Geoff (ed.), Asian Expansions: The Historical Experiences of Polity Expansion in Asia, Routledge, pp. 144–166, ISBN 978-0-41558-995-6
- Nguyễn Phước, Tương (2004). Hội An - Di sản thế giới [Hội An - World Heritage] (in Vietnamese). Ho Chi Minh City: Nhà xuất bản Văn nghệ.
- Phan Khoang (2001). Việt sử xứ Đàng Trong (in Vietnamese). Hanoi: Văn Học Publishing House.
- Popkin, Samuel (1979), The Rational Peasant: The Political Economy of Rural Society in Vietnam, University of California Press, ISBN 978-0-520-03954-4
- O'Brien, Patrick Karl (2007), Philip's Atlas of World History, Philip's, ISBN 978-0-54008-867-6
- Peters, Erica J. (2012), Appetites and Aspirations in Vietnam: Food and Drink in the Long Nineteenth Century, AltaMira Press, ISBN 978-0-759-12075-4
- Quốc sử quán triều Nguyễn (2007). Đại Nam thực lục chính biên. Vol. Tập một: Tiền biên và Chính biên-Kỷ thứ nhất (từ 1558 đến 1819) (bản dịch của Viện Sử học Việt Nam ed.). Hà Nội: Nhà xuất bản Giáo dục.
- Richardson, John (1880). A smaller manual of modern geography. Physical and political. John Murray.
- Sơn Nam (2009). Lịch sử Khẩn Hoang Miền Nam (1st ed.). Thành phố Hồ Chí Minh: Nhà Xuất bản Trẻ.
- Staunton, Sidney A. (1884). The War in Tong-king:Why the French are in Tong-king, and what They are Doing There. Cupples, Upham.
- Tạ Chí Đại Trường (1973). Lịch sử Nội Chiến Việt Nam 1771–1802 (in Vietnamese). Sài Gòn: Nhà xuất bản Văn Sử Học.
- Tarling, Nicholas (1999). The Cambridge History of Southeast Asia. Vol. 1 (part 2). Cambridge University Press. ISBN 0-521-66370-9.
- Taylor, K.W. (2013), A History of the Vietnamese, Cambridge University Press, ISBN 978-0-520-07417-0
- Thụy Khuê (2017). Vua Gia Long và người Pháp: khảo sát về ảnh hưởng của người Pháp trong giai đoạn triều Nguyễn (in Vietnamese). Nhà xuất bản Hồng Đức. ISBN 978-6049517655. OCLC 1079783921.
- Toda, Ed (1882). Annam and its minor currency. Noronha & Sons.
- Trần Trọng Kim (2018). Việt Nam sử lược. Hanoi: Kim Đồng Publishing House. ISBN 978-604-2-08603-5.
- Verlag d. Industrie-Comptoirs (Austria) (1827). Neue allgemeine geographische und statistische Ephemeriden.
- White, John (1824). A Voyage to Cochinchina. Longman, Hurst, Rees, Orme, Brown, and Green.
- Whitmore, John K.; Zottoli, Brian (2016), "The Emergence of the state of Vietnam", in Peterson, Willard J. (ed.), The Cambridge History of China: Volume 9, The Ch'ing Dynasty to 1800, Part 2, Cambridge: Cambridge University Press, pp. 197–233
- Woodside, Alexander (1988) [1971]. Vietnam and the Chinese model: a comparative study of Vietnamese and Chinese government in the first half of the nineteenth century. Cambridge, Massachusetts: Harvard University Press. ISBN 0-674-93721-X.
- Wilcox, Wynn (2010). Vietnam and the West: New Approaches. Cornell University, Southeast Asia Program. ISBN 978-0-877-27782-8.
- Woods, L. Shelton (2002). Vietnam: a global studies handbook. ABC-CLIO. ISBN 978-1-57607-416-9.
- Ooi, Keat Gin (2004). Southeast Asia: A Historical Encyclopedia, from Angkor Wat to East Timor. ABC-CLIO. ISBN 978-1-57607-770-2.
- Phan, Khoang (1985). Việt sử: xứ đàng trong, 1558–1777. Cuộc nam-tié̂n của dân-tộc Việt-Nam (in Vietnamese). Xuân thu. Archived from the original on 4 January 2024.
- Knoblock, John; Riegel, Jeffrey (2001). The Annals of Lü Buwei. Stanford University Press. ISBN 978-0804733540.
- Yue Hashimoto, Oi-kan (1972). Phonology of Cantonese. Cambridge University Press. ISBN 978-0-521-08442-0.

=== Articles ===
- Cooke, Nola (2004). "Early Nineteenth-Century Vietnamese Catholics and Others in the Pages of the Annales de la Propagation de la Foi". Journal of Southeast Asian Studies. 35 (2): 261–285. doi:10.1017/S0022463404000141. S2CID 153524504 – via Cambridge University Press.
- Dyt, Karynth (2015). "Calling for Wind and Rain" Rituals: Environment, Emotion, and Governance in Nguyễn Vietnam, 1802–1883". Journal of Vietnamese Studies. 10 (2): 1–42. doi:10.1525/vs.2015.10.2.1.
- Friedland, William H. (1977). "Community and Revolution in Modern Vietnam. Alexander B. Woodside". American Journal of Sociology. 83 (2). Chicago: University of Chicago: 520–521. doi:10.1086/226584.
- Koizomi, Junko (2015). "The 'Last' Friendship Exchanges between Siam and Vietnam, 1879–1882: Siam between Vietnam and France – and Beyond". TRaNS: Trans-Regional and -National Studies of Southeast Asia. 4 (1): 131–164. doi:10.1017/trn.2015.18. S2CID 163196181 – via Cambridge University Press.
- Kelley, Liam C. (2006). "'Confucianism' in Vietnam: A State of the Field Essay". Journal of Vietnamese Studies. 1 (1–2): 314–370. doi:10.1525/vs.2006.1.1-2.314. Archived from the original on 27 August 2016 – via University of California Press.
- Nguyễn Quang Trung Tiến (1999). "Hệ quả cuộc cách mạng 1789 đối với tiến trình thâm nhập Việt Nam của chủ nghĩa tư bản Pháp và "tấn bi kịch Gia Long"". Tạp chí Thông tin Khoa học và Công nghệ. 1 (23).
- Rungswasdisab, Puangthong (1995). War and trade: Siamese interventions in Cambodia, 1767–1851 (PhD thesis). University of Wollongong Australia. Archived from the original on 20 January 2021.
- Smith, R. B. (1974). "Politics and Society in Viet-Nam during the Early Nguyen Period (1802–62)". The Journal of the Royal Asiatic Society of Great Britain and Ireland. 106 (2): 153–169. doi:10.1017/S0035869X00131995. S2CID 155581972.
- Weber, Nicholas (2011). "Securing and Developing the Southwestern Region: The Role of the Cham and Malay Colonies in Vietnam (18th–19th centuries)". Journal of the Economic and Social History of the Orient. 54 (5): 739–772. doi:10.1163/156852011X614037 – via Brill Publishers.
- Shaofei, YE; Guoqing, Zhang (2016). "The relationship between Nanyue and Annam in the ancient historical records of China and Vietnam". Honghe Prefecture Center for Vietnamese Studies, Honghe University. Archived from the original on 16 October 2018 – via CNKI Journal Translation Project.
- Meacham, William (1996). "Defining the Hundred Yue". Bulletin of the Indo-Pacific Prehistory Association. 15: 93–100. doi:10.7152/bippa.v15i0.11537 (inactive 12 July 2025). hdl:10722/208513.
- Norman, Jerry; Mei, Tsu-lin (1976). "The Austroasiatics in Ancient South China: Some Lexical Evidence". Monumenta Serica. 32: 274–301. doi:10.1080/02549948.1976.11731121.

Vietnam National Museum of History, Cho Lon Geographical, economic and cultural history: Part 1, 2026

— Royal house — Nguyễn dynasty Founding year: 1802 Deposition: 1945
Preceded by Tây Sơn dynasty	Dynasty of Vietnam; 1 June 1802 – 30 August 1945	Vacant Monarchy abolished Republic declared
