= Vietnamese Constitutional Monarchist League =

Vietnamese Constitutional Monarchist League Liên Minh Quân Chủ Lập Hiến Đa Nguyên Việt Nam
- President: Nguyễn Phúc Bửu Chánh
- Founded: 1993
- Headquarters: United States
- Ideology: Monarchism; Anti-communism; Vietnamese nationalism
- Political position: Center-right to right-wing

Party flag

Website
- https://web.archive.org/web/20110712215235/http://vcml.homestead.com/

Vietnamese Constitutional Monarchist League (VCML; Vietnamese: Liên Minh Quân Chủ Lập Hiến Đa Nguyên Việt Nam) is a monarchist and anti-communist organization based in the United States, which seeks the restoration of the Nguyễn dynasty to the throne of Vietnam under a constitutional monarchy, similar to those in Cambodia and Thailand. The VCML's position is that Emperor Bảo Đại was the last legitimate ruler of Vietnam. Bảo Đại and his children do not support the VCML or their political aspirations.

== History ==
The VCML was established in 1993 by its current President and Regent of the Imperial Nguyen dynasty Nguyễn Phúc Bửu Chánh, a member of the Vietnamese royal family who fled from South Vietnam for political reasons after 1975.

Vietnam's last emperor, Bảo Đại, lived in Europe until his death on 30 July 1997. His son, Crown Prince Bảo Long, intentionally remained out of politics and lived quietly in Paris, France until his death on 28 July 2007. His brother, Prince Bảo Thăng, did not support the VCML through to his death on 15 March 2017. The position of Head of the Imperial House is now held by Prince Phúc Bảo Ngọc.

== Political positions ==
The VCML believes that "only the limited monarchy of the Imperial Nguyen Dynasty can succeed in preserving the cultural independence of Vietnam" and that "only a government that upholds Vietnamese nationalism and personal freedom can fully succeed in restoring the nation".

The VCML has repeatedly denounced the communist government of Vietnam over corruption and human rights abuses.
