= House of Nguyễn Phúc =

Former ruling family of Vietnam

House of Nguyễn Phúc House of Nguyễn Phước 阮福族 Nguyễn Clan
- Imperial House
- Country: Nam Hà / Đàng Trong; Nguyễn dynasty French protectorates of Annam and Tonkin; Empire of Vietnam; State of Vietnam: Domain of the Crown
- Founded: 1558
- Founder: Nguyễn Hoàng (Note: Nguyễn Kim is technically the founder of Nguyễn lords but he never claimed himself as a Nguyễn Lord, hence he is not considered as the first Nguyễn Lord.)
- Current head: Nguyễn Phúc Bảo Ngọc
- Final ruler: Bảo Đại
- Titles: Nguyễn lords: Lord of Đàng Trong (主塘中, Chúa Đàng Trong); Grand Mentor Duke of the State of Trừng (太傅澄國公, Thái phó Trừng quốc công); Grand guardian commandery duke (太保郡公, Thái bảo quận công); Nguyễn King; Quốc vương (國王); Nguyễn dynasty: Emperor of Đại Việt; Emperor of Việt Nam; Emperor of Đại Nam; Son of Heaven; State of Vietnam: Chief of State of Vietnam; Emperor of the Domain of the Crown
- Styles: "His/Her Imperial Majesty"; Đức (德); Hoàng thượng (皇上)
- Connected families: House of Trịnh (though Nguyễn Kim, whoms brother-in-law was Trịnh Kiểm}
- Distinctions: Nguyễn Kim; Nguyễn Trãi (claimed)
- Traditions: Confucianism, Buddhism, and Catholicism
- Estate: Imperial City of Huế
- Deposition: 1777 (Tây Sơn Rebellion); 1945 (Abdication of Bảo Đại) (Note: Bảo Đại was fully removed from Vietnamese politics following a referendum in 1955.); 1955 State of Vietnam referendum 1955 (abolition of the Domain of the Crown)
- Cadet branches: Tôn Thất, Tôn Nữ

House of Nguyễn Phúc House of Nguyễn Phước

Vietnamese name
- Vietnamese alphabet: Nguyễn Phúc tộc / Nguyễn Phước tộc
- Chữ Hán: 阮福族

The House of Nguyễn Phúc, also known as the House of Nguyễn Phước, is a family and a branch of the surname Nguyễn in Vietnam. Its members were the Nguyễn lords (1558–1777, 1780–1802) and emperors of the Nguyễn dynasty (1802–45). Its member Bảo Đại was also emperor of the State of Vietnam (1949–55) and Domain of the Crown (1950–55). Nguyễn Bặc (924–79), an official of the Đinh dynasty, was its founder.

Under Emperor Gia Long, the family's rule was not only restored, but extended to the whole of Vietnam in 1802, thus marking the start of the unified Nguyễn dynasty. The Nguyễn dynasty agreed to French supervision in 1883. In 1887, Vietnam became part of the Indochinese Union, which was administered by a French governor general.

Emperor Bảo Đại, the last ruler of the dynasty, changed the name of the country from Annam back to Vietnam, a name that originated with Gia Long. He abdicated in fear for his life in 1945 after the Viet Minh attempted to assassinate one of his former prime ministers. The French returned following the surrender of Japan. Bảo Đại fled to Hong Kong, where he developed a reputation as a playboy.

French President Charles de Gaulle suggested that former Emperor Duy Tân return to Vietnam and reenter politics. Duy Tân, now a national hero, died when his return flight crashed in 1945. In 1949, Vietnamese non-communist nationalists and the French re-installed Bảo Đại and created the State of Vietnam with him as chief of state (國長 Quốc trưởng). The French also oversaw the creation of the Domain of the Crown where he was still officially considered to be the emperor. This territory existed until 1955. Bảo Đại died in 1997 in Paris, France.

According to an article by The New York Times in 1973, it was estimated then by former empress dowager Hoàng Thị Cúc, mother of the last ruler Bảo Đại, that the royal family had over 200,000 descendants.

== History ==
=== As a ruling house ===
The House of Nguyễn Phúc (Nguyen Gia Mieu) had historically been founded in the 14th century in Gia Mieu village, Thanh Hoa Province, before they came to rule southern Vietnam from 1558 to 1777, then became the ruling dynasty of the entire Vietnam. Traditionally, the family traces themselves to Nguyễn Bặc (924–979), the first duke of Dai Viet. Princes and male descendants of Gia Long are called Hoàng Thân, while male lineal descendants of previous Nguyen lords are named Tôn Thất. Grandsons of the emperor were Hoàng tôn. Daughters of the emperor were called Hoàng nữ, and always earned the title công chúa (princess).

Their succession practically is according to the law of primogeniture, but sometimes conflicted. The first succession conflict arose in 1816 when Gia Long was designing for an heir. His first prince Nguyễn Phúc Cảnh died in 1802. As a result, two rival factions emerged, one support Nguyễn Phúc Mỹ Đường, the eldest son of Prince Cảnh, as the crown prince, while other support Prince Nguyễn Phúc Đảm (later Minh Mang). The second conflict was the 1847 succession when two young princes Nguyễn Phúc Hồng Bảo and Hồng Nhậm were dragged by the ill-failing emperor Thieu Tri as a potential heir. At first, Thieu Tri apparently chose Prince Hồng Bảo because he was older, but after hearing advice from two regents Trương Đăng Quế and Nguyễn Tri Phương, he revised the heir at last minute and choose Hồng Nhậm as the crown prince.

Since the fall of Huế during the Cần Vương rebellion against the French on 7 May 1885 the government of the French protectorate of Annam would gradually take over the management of the budget and finances of the government of the Southern dynasty. In 1894, the court of the Thành Thái Emperor assigned Resident-Superior Léon Jules Pol Boulloche to take care of the management of the state's revenues, expenditures, taxes, Etc. In 1900, the Governor-General of French Indochina issued a decree that established the Council of the Protectorate (Hội đồng Bảo hộ) alongside the Resident-Superior to "discuss and determine the revenue and expenditures of the budget of the French protectorate of Annam, but that this council would act according to the calculations and orders of the Resident-Superior. At the meetings of the Council of French Indochina (Hội đồng Đông Dương) the Governor-General would decide through executive orders." Because of these reformes the Huế Court lost a lot of power and had to remove the privileges of the imperial family of the Nguyễn dynasty. This meant a reduction in provisions and money given to the descendants of the imperial lineage, gradually a number of members of the Imperial Clan of the Nguyễn dynasty would fall into poverty as they heavily relied on state welfare.

In a 1938 interview in the Tràng An newspaper with the Đại thần of the Court of the Imperial Clan (宗人府大臣, Tôn Nhơn phủ Đại thần) Ưng Trình (1882—1974) about a petition that the members of the imperial clan have to the same taxes as the other groups represented in the House of People's Representatives of Annam, Ưng Trình noted that there were 2000 male members Phủ Tôn Nhơn aged 18 to 60 and that 3 out of 4 were unemployed and did not own any land. This showed that a lot of the members of the imperial clan lived in poverty and battled with many difficulties such as chronic unemployment and hunger.

=== Abolition of the monarchy ===
The abdication of Bảo Đại took place on 25 August 1945 and marked the end of the 143-year reign of the Nguyễn dynasty over Vietnam ending the Vietnamese monarchy. Bảo Đại abdicated in response to the August Revolution a ceremony handing power over to the newly established Democratic Republic of Vietnam which was established during the end of World War II as Vietnam had been occupied by French and later Japanese imperialists.

After the Việt Minh sent a telegram to the Imperial City of Huế demanding the abdication of Emperor Bảo Đại, he announced that he would abdicate and officially abdicated on 25 August. After a representative of the Việt Minh convinced Bảo Đại to hold a public abdication ceremony he did so on 30 August 1945. The passing of the ceremonial seal and sword had been seen as symbolically "passing the Mandate of Heaven over to the government of the Democratic Republic of Vietnam". Following his abdication Emperor Bảo Đại became "citizen Vĩnh Thụy" (公民永瑞, công dân Vĩnh Thụy) and would become an advisor to the new Democratic Republic of Vietnam government in Hanoi.

=== French attempts to re-establish the Nguyễn dynasty ===
The coat of arms of the State of Vietnam.

In order to combat the influence of the Democratic Republic of Vietnam and the Việt Minh the French were forced to grant more autonomy to the Vietnamese and French President Vincent Auriol arranged for the former Emperor Bảo Đại to return to Vietnam and lead a new autonomous Vietnamese state in what the French called the "Bảo Đại solution" (Giải pháp Bảo Đại). On 24 April 1949 Bảo Đại would return from France back to Vietnam. Nearly two months later, on 14 June 1949 Bảo Đại issued an ordinance giving him the position of "Chief of State of the State of Vietnam" (Quốc trưởng Quốc gia Việt Nam), in his memoirs he claimed that he did this to receive better recognition on an international level. Furthermore, in his memoirs he emphasised that his proper title was "Emperor, Chief of State" (Hoàng đế, Quốc trưởng). The position was supposed to only be temporary until Vietnam would have an elected constitutional parliament.

In 1950 Bảo Đại was given the "Domain of the Crown" which included ethnic minority lands within Vietnam that were directly placed under his rule where he remained to be the "Emperor". It was officially established on 15 April 1950 and dissolved on 11 March 1955.

During his time as Chief of State he was often absent from most events in Vietnam and would frequently spend his time in Europe or in his domain, specifically in the resort towns of Đà Lạt, Nha Trang, and Buôn Ma Thuột, rather than attending to his responsibilities as the head of the government.

Bảo Đại was ousted as the Chief of State of the State of Vietnam during a rigged election in 1955.

=== After 1955 ===
The personal coat of arms of the Bảo Đại Emperor which appeared on the cover of his autobiographical memoires Le dragon d'Annam, Bao Daï (1980).

In 1957, during his visit to the Alsace region, Bảo Đại met Christiane Bloch-Carcenac with whom he had an affair for several years. The relationship with Bloch-Carcenac resulted in the birth of his last child, Patrick-Edward Bloch-Carcenac, who still lives in Alsace in France.

In 1972, Bảo Đại issued a public statement from exile, appealing to the Vietnamese people for national reconciliation, stating, "The time has come to put an end to the fratricidal war and to recover at last peace and accord". At times, Bảo Đại maintained residence in southern France, and in particular, in Monaco, where he sailed often on his private yacht, one of the largest in Monte Carlo harbour. He still reportedly held great influence among local political figures in the Quảng Trị and Thừa Thiên provinces of Huế. The Communist government of North Vietnam sent representatives to France hoping that Bảo Đại would become a member of a coalition government which might reunite Vietnam, in the hope of attracting his supporters in the regions wherein he still held influence.

As a result of these meetings, Bảo Đại publicly spoke out against the presence of American troops in South Vietnam, and he criticised President Nguyễn Văn Thiệu's regime in South Vietnam. He called for all political factions to create a free, neutral, peace-loving government which would resolve the tense situation that had taken form in the country.

In 1982, Bảo Đại, his wife Monique, and other members of the former imperial family of Vietnam visited the United States. His agenda was to oversee and bless Buddhist and Caodaiist religious ceremonies, in the Californian and Texan Vietnamese-American communities.

Throughout Bảo Đại's life in both Vietnam and in France, he remained unpopular among the Vietnamese populace as he was considered a political puppet for the French colonialist regime, for lacking any form of political power, and for his cooperation with the French and for his pro-French ideals. The former emperor clarified, however, that his reign was always a constant battle and a balance between preserving the monarchy and the integrity of the nation versus fealty to the French authorities. Ultimately, power devolved away from his person and into ideological camps and in the face of Diem's underestimated influences on factions within the empire. Bảo Đại died in a military hospital in Paris, France, on 30 July 1997. He was interred in the Cimetière de Passy. Following Bảo Đại's death Bảo Long inherited the position of head of the House of Nguyễn Phúc. He remained out of politics and lived quietly in Paris.

Bảo Long allegedly sold the sword that was handed over in the 1945 abdication ceremony. Although the Vietnamese Constitutional Monarchist League (headed by rival claimant Nguyễn Phúc Bửu Chánh) wish to restore the Nguyễn dynasty to the throne under a constitutional monarchy, as in Cambodia and Thailand, Bảo Long did not support their political aspirations.

On 28 July 2007, following the death of Bảo Long, the new head of the House of Nguyễn Phúc became Nguyễn Phúc Bảo Thăng.

Bảo Thăng died on 22/3/2017, and the title of head of the House passed to Nguyễn Phúc Bảo Ngọc.

In June 2022 the organisation Hội đồng Nguyễn Phước tộc Việt Nam proposed to rename a street "Đường Gia Long" in Huế in honour the 220th anniversary of Gia Long Emperor's unification of the country.

== Titles ==
First appointed to govern over the region south of the Gianh River by the Emperor of the Later Lê Dynasty, the first ancestor of the Nguyễn lords in this region appointed who was given a title of nobility was Nguyễn Kim, who was granted the title of the Duke of the State of Trừng (澄國公, Trừng quốc công). The highest title of nobility in Vietnam was that of Quốc Vương (國王), which Liam Kelley translates as "Prince" or "Prince of state", (Note: As for the offspring of the Emperor, who were "actual princes", different terms were used in the Vietnamese system such as "Hoàng tử" (皇子) or less commonly "Thân vương" (親王), these terms are often translated into the English language as "Princes of the blood.") immediately below it was the title of "Duke" (公, công) with titles like "Commandery duke" (郡公, quận công), "Duke of state" (國公, quốc công), etc. Prefixes, like "Grand mentor" (太傅, thái phó) and "Grand guardian" (太保, thái bảo) were sometimes added to these somewhat general terms to create gradations between the varying ranks of nobility.

Lord Nguyễn Hoàng received the noble title of "Grand Mentor Duke of the State of Trừng" (太傅澄國公, Thái phó Trừng quốc công) by the Emperor of the Later Lê dynasty, later Lord Nguyễn Phúc Nguyên (the son of Nguyễn Hoàng) would receive the upgraded title "Grand guardian commandery duke" (太保郡公, Thái bảo quận công).

Later titles were granted by the Nguyễn lords to themselves, however, they would continue to recognise both the titles of the imperial court of the Later Lê dynasty and their nominal submission to it. According to the Đại Nam thực lục, in 1744 an official from Đàng Trong named Nguyễn Đăng Thịnh requested for his lord Nguyễn Phúc Khoát to "rectify his position", but in reality Nguyễn Đăng Thịnh asked him proclaim himself to be an Emperor justifying it by stating that he already controlled more land than the Shang dynasty did when it was founded. In response Nguyễn Phúc Khoát granted himself the title of Quốc Vương in 1744, the same title which the Trịnh lords held since 1599. An important distinction between the rival Nguyễn and Trịnh clans is that the Trịnh were granted the title of Vương by the Emperor while the Nguyễn never officially held a title higher than "duke" in the eyes of the Lê court.

== Organisations ==
=== Đồng tôn tương tế phổ ===
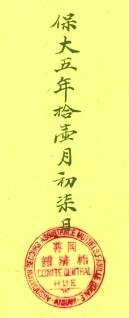
The seal of the Đồng tôn tương tế phổ affixed to a document issued in the year Bảo Đại 5 (1930).

The Đồng tôn tương tế phổ (Hán-Nôm: 同尊相濟譜; French: Association Secours Assistance Mutuels Famille Royale Annam) was officially established in November 1926 by well to do members of the imperial clan, the organisation was tasked with trying to help the poorer members of the imperial clan through solidarity, mutual assistance, care for mourning, hospitality, and education. The first meeting of the Đồng tôn tương tế phổ was held by its 21 founders at the headquarters of the Court of the Imperial Clan in Huế, the establishment ceremony of the organisation was attended by a number of officials of the Court of the Imperial Clan as well as French and Vietnamese guests. Unlike the Court of the Imperial Clan which pertained itself to the political and religious affairs of the Nguyễn Phúc clan, the Đồng tôn tương tế phổ was established "to compel the kinship and cordiality of relatives of the imperial clan and to advise each other to do good, in the following ways: First, to obtain the resources or money to support each other in the case of an accident and with the mourning process; secondly, to help members of the imperial clan to educate their children to be intelligent and provide money for and help with the education of the impoverished members of the imperial clan to help them attain literacy or apprenticeships, and thirdly, the association wrote congratulatory letters as well as invitations and distributed gifts to members of the imperial clan for their happiness".

The members of the Đồng tôn tương tế phổ agreed on a detailed draft programme with 55 points which would dictate what the organisation would do. The people who helped draft this programme included both Confucianists and Western educated members, the members who helped draft the programme included the Tham tri of the Ministry of War (Binh bộ Tham tri) Ưng Bàng, the Lang trung of the Ministry of Justice (Lang trung Bộ Hình) Tôn Thất Toại, the administrator Bửu Trưng, the Tham tri of the Ministry of Public Works (Công bộ Tham tri) Ưng Đồng, the provisional manager of education of the Ministry of Rites (Thị độc học sĩ Tạm phái Lễ bộ) Ưng Gia, and the French-trained educator Ưng Lộc. The Đồng tôn tương tế phổ's programme was finally approved by the interim Resident-Superior of Annam Jean Charles Joseph d'Elloy on 6 October 1926.

On the 16th day of the 8th month of the year Bảo Đại 2 (11 September 1927) the Đồng tôn tương tế phổ held another meeting at the palace of the Court of the Imperial Clan which was attended by 99 members of the association, during this meeting they discussed a review of the programme. A revised charter was drafted which would lend books and distribute ink to good students who were members of the Nguyễn Phúc imperial clan. On 13 March 1928 the Resident-Superior of Annam Jules Friès approved the new charter. From this point onwards the Đồng tôn tương tế phổ became an official association with 184 members enjoying full legal status that was recognised by the government, had a strict organisational structure, budget, and its own seal.

The seal of the Đồng tôn tương tế phổ was circular in shape and was divided into two parts, in the outer ring was the inscription Association Secours Assistance Mutuels Famille Royale-Annam in French (which translated into Vietnamese as Hội Cứu tế – Tương tế hoàng tộc – Trung kỳ), while in its centre were the Traditional Chinese characters "同尊相濟譜" (Đồng tôn tương tế phổ) followed by the French inscription Comite Central Hue.

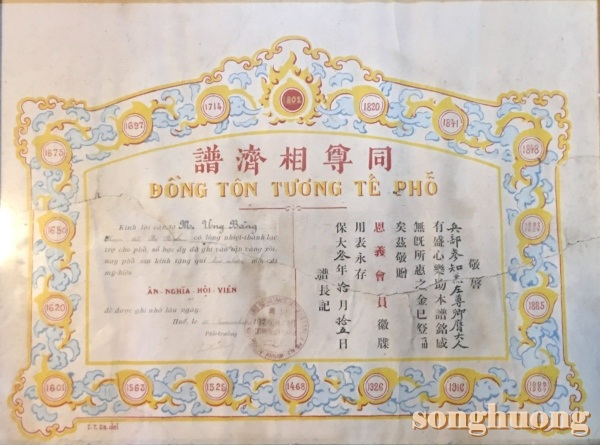
A certificate of gratitude for a member (Bằng chứng nhận Ân nghĩa hội viên) issued by the Đồng tôn tương tế phổ to the Tham tri of the Ministry of War, Mr. Ưng Bàng.

All rules and regulations of the association were published in a book entitled the Đồng-tôn-tương-tế phổ Chương-trình (同尊相濟譜章程, "Programme of the Đồng tôn tương tế phổ") first published in Huế in 1930. The contents of the book were dictated by the Board of Trustees and it contained the purpose, principles, ideals, and modes of operation of association, as well as the rights and obligations of its members. Additionally, documents related to the annual General Assembly meeting were also synthesised and published by the Board of Trustees into books for distribution to members for reference and monitoring.

The organisational structure of the Đồng tôn tương tế phổ was headed by a Governing Council (Hội đồng trị sự), which (during its establishment in 1926) consisted of 1 chief (Phổ trưởng), 1 deputy chief (Phó Phổ trưởng), 1 secretary (Thư ký), 2 deputy secretaries (Phó Thư ký) of which 1 would be a French language specialist and 1 would be a Chinese characters specialist, 1 fund manager (Trưởng quỹ), and 1 depupty fund manager (Phó Trưởng quỹ). By 1927, the Governing Council had adjusted its organisational apparatus, and from here the organisational structure of the association would change regularly from time to time to suit the actual situation of the time and match the development of organisation.

Officially the Bảo Đại Emperor was the head of the organisation and he personally donated 1000 piastres during its first year of existence. Furthermore, honorary members of the association also included the Resident-Superior of Annam and many high ranking members of the government of the Southern dynasty.

The organisation also had provincial chapters which were allowed to elect a delegate to attend the annual meetings in the Imperial City of Huế. Every year the Governing Council would summarise the work done in the previous year, make a report on the income and expenditures of the association, and discuss the plans for the next year.

The association helped members of the Nguyễn Phúc clan study (from primary school to university), teach them morality, start private businesses, and study abroad in Hanoi or Western countries. During its existence the Đồng tôn tương tế phổ helped many members of the Nguyễn Phúc clan improve their professional skills and offered financial support to the younger members of the clan by providing literacy training, vocational training, and university scholarships.

With the abolition of the Nguyễn dynasty in 1945 the Court of the Imperial Clan was abolished which also meant the end of the national operations of the Đồng tôn tương tế phổ.

=== Hội đồng trị sự Nguyễn Phước Tộc ===
After the abolition of the Nguyễn dynasty state in 1945 the Court of the Imperial Clan changed from being a government agency into a non-governmental organisation becoming the Hội đồng trị sự Nguyễn Phước Tộc which continued to fulfill the roles of the Court of the Imperial Clan.

Between the years 1971 and 1972 the Hội đồng trị sự Nguyễn Phước Tộc donated large sums of money to rebuild the Thái miếu, which was almost completely destroyed during the First Indochina War. The rebuilt Thái miếu was used as a hall to hold sacrificial rituals worshipping the Nguyễn lords. The restoration of the Thái miếu not only re-established and enriched the ancestor worshipping facilities at the Imperial City, it also made the former Nguyễn capital a more attractive destination for tourists.

=== Nguyễn Phước Tộc tương tế hội ===
The Nguyễn Phước Tộc tương tế hội was established by Decree No. 876/BNV/KS/14 (Nghị định số 876/BNV/KS/14) issued by the Ministry of Internal Affairs of the government of South Vietnam. The creation of the Nguyễn Phước Tộc tương tế hội was requested by the Hội đồng trị sự Nguyễn Phước Tộc to fulfill the duties of the earlier Đồng tôn tương tế phổ that existed during the Nguyễn dynasty period to help the members of the Nguyễn Phúc clan.

While the Nguyễn Phước Tộc tương tế hội was initially effective, it was eventually abolished.

=== Hội đồng Nguyễn Phúc tộc Việt Nam ===
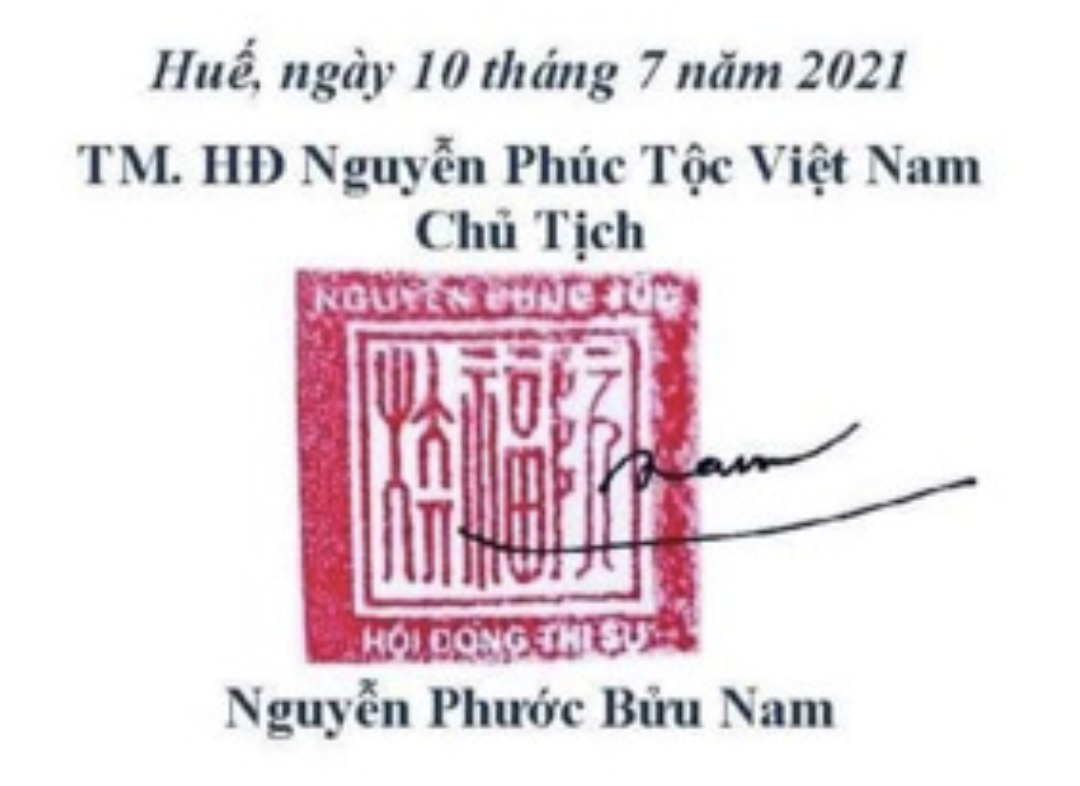
The seal of the Hội đồng Nguyễn Phúc tộc Việt Nam.

The Hội đồng Nguyễn Phúc tộc Việt Nam (also written as the Hội đồng Nguyễn Phước tộc Việt Nam) is an organisation of the Nguyễn Phúc clan. As of June 2022 the chairman of this organisation is Associate Professor Dr. Nguyễn Phước Bửu Nam.

On 26 April 2022 Thanh Niên reported on the worshipping of bà Thứ phi Hoàng Phi Yến at the Tùng Thiện Vương Temple in Huế, Thừa Thiên Huế province. The Hội đồng Nguyễn Phúc tộc Việt Nam organised a scholarly discussion on "An Sơn Temple and Mrs. Phi Yến in Côn Đảo, a matter of legends to heritage records" (An Sơn miếu và bà Phi Yến ở Côn Đảo, vấn đề từ truyền thuyết đến hồ sơ di sản). After the discussion, the Hội đồng Nguyễn Phúc tộc Việt Nam proposed to the Ministry of Culture, Sports and Tourism to revoke the decision to recognise the national intangible cultural heritage (Di sản văn hóa phi vật thể) for the death anniversary of the imperial concubine Phi Yến.

The seminar had the presence and participation of scholars about history, culture, and the Nguyễn dynasty period from Huế and Hanoi, including the former chairman of the Historical Science Society of Thừa Thiên – Huế (Hội Khoa học Lịch sử Thừa Thiên – Huế). The researchers included Nguyễn Xuân Hoa (former director of the Department of Culture and Sports of Thừa Thiên Huế province), Nguyễn Quang Trung Tiến (former dean of the Faculty of History, Huế University of Science), Assoc. Prof. Dr. Nguyễn Văn Đăng (former dean of the Faculty of History, Huế University of Science), Trần Đại Vinh (former President of the Folk Arts Association of Thừa Thiên Huế)， Nguyễn Đắc Xuân, and Dr. Nguyễn Xuân Diện (Institute of Hán-Nôm Studies, Vietnam Academy of Social Sciences), among others. The seminar received 16 reports from researchers, of which 3 were presented at the seminar and more than 10 comments were presented. The scholars concluded that imperial concubine Phi Yến is a fictional character.

They noted that imperial concubine Phi Yến is not recorded in the official history of the Nguyễn dynasty, nor is she found in the genealogy of the imperial family of the Nguyễn dynasty (Hoàng tộc triều Nguyễn). The records show that both French scholars and published studies prove that the Thứ phi Hoàng Phi Yến (named Lê Thị Răm) and Prince Cải (also known as Prince Hội An, or hoàng tử Hội An) are both fictional characters that do not appear in the history of the Nguyễn dynasty.

In May 2022 the Ministry of Culture, Sports and Tourism responded that they would consider revoking the intangible cultural heritage status based on the recommendations of the Hội đồng Nguyễn Phúc tộc Việt Nam.

In 2022 the organisation participated in a scholarly discussion on merits and important historical contributions of Emperor Gia Long, where they noted how after territorial reunification Gia Long established sovereignty over the Hoàng Sa and Trường Sa Archipelagos.

== Heads of the house ==
The generational numbers below are from the clan's genealogical table. On several occasions, emperors were deposed by the French colonial authorities and replaced with representatives of alternative royal lines. The "I" line is viewed as the most legitimate line. The Dục Đức line goes 15.I, 16.I, 17.I, and 18.I, while the Đồng Khánh line goes 15.II, 16.II, 17.II, 18.II, and 18.III.

Heads of the House of Nguyễn Phúc
Gen.	Lived	Reign	Given name	Era name	Notes
1	1525–1545		Nguyễn Kim		
Nguyễn Lords
2	1558–1613	1558–1613	Nguyễn Hoàng		
3	1563–1635	1613–1635	Nguyễn Phúc Nguyên		First to use the name "Nguyễn Phúc"
4	1601–1648	1635–1648	Nguyễn Phúc Lan		
5	1620–1687	1648–1687	Nguyễn Phúc Tần		
6	1650–1691	1687–1691	Nguyễn Phúc Thái		
7	1675–1725	1691–1725	Nguyễn Phúc Chu		
8	1696–1738	1725–1738	Nguyễn Phúc Trú		
9	1714–1765	1738–1765	Nguyễn Phúc Khoát		
10	1754–1777	1765–1777	Nguyễn Phúc Thuần		
Emperors of Vietnam
11	1762–1820	1802–1820	Nguyễn Phúc Ánh	Gia Long	Son of Nguyễn Phúc Luân.
12	1791–1841	1820–1841	Nguyễn Phúc Đảm	Minh Mạng	Son of Gia Long.
13	1807–1847	1841–1847	Nguyễn Phúc Miên Tông	Thiệu Trị	Son of Minh Mạng.
14.I	1829–1883	1847–1883	Nguyễn Phúc Thi	Tự Đức	Son of Thiệu Trị.
15.I	1852–1883	20–23 July 1883	Nguyễn Phúc Ưng Ái	Dục Đức	Son of Nguyễn Phúc Hồng Y, grandson of Thiệu Trị.
14.II	1847–1883	30 July–29 November 1883	Nguyễn Phúc Hồng Dật	Hiệp Hòa	Son of Thiệu Trị.
15.III	1869–1884	1883–1884	Nguyễn Phúc Ưng Đăng	Kiến Phúc	Third son of Nguyễn Phúc Hồng Cai, grandson of Thiệu Trị. A nephew of Tự Đức who was adopted as a son.
15.IV	1872–1943	1884–1885	Nguyễn Phúc Ưng Lịch	Hàm Nghi	Fifth son of Nguyễn Phúc Hồng Cai, grandson of Thiệu Trị. Younger half-brother of Kiến Phúc and Đồng Khánh.
15.II	1864–1889	1885–1889	Nguyễn Phúc Ưng Kỷ	Đồng Khánh	Eldest son of Nguyễn Phúc Hồng Cai, grandson of Thiệu Trị. A nephew of Tự Đức who was adopted as a son.
16.I	1879–1954	1889–1907	Nguyễn Phúc Bửu Lân	Thành Thái	Son of Dục Đức. Deposed by the French in favor of his son, Duy Tân.
17.I	1900–1945	1907–1916	Nguyễn Phúc Vĩnh San	Duy Tân	Son of Thành Thái.
16.II	1885–1925	1916–1925	Nguyễn Phúc Bửu Đảo	Khải Định	Son of Đồng Khánh. He reigned after Duy Tân was deposed by the French, so his succession and generational order are not the same.
17.II	1913–1997	1926–1945	Nguyễn Phúc Vĩnh Thụy	Bảo Đại	Son of Khải Định. Emperor of Annam from 1926 to 1945, Emperor of Vietnam in 1945, and chief of state of South Vietnam from 1949 to 1955.
Heads of the house since 1997
18.II	1934–2007	1997–2007	Nguyễn Phúc Bảo Long		Crown prince and eldest son of Bao Dai.
18.III	1944–2017	2007–2017	Nguyễn Phúc Bảo Thăng		Brother of Bảo Long.
18.I	born 1933	2017–present	Nguyễn Phúc Bảo Ngọc (Guy Georges Vĩnh San)		Eldest son of Duy Tân.

== Symbols ==
=== Imperial standards ===
Flag	Duration	Use	Name/Description
	1885–1890	Flag of emperor Đồng Khánh	Đại Nam Đế Kỳ (Personal standard of the Emperor of Đại Nam). Đại Nam (大南, great south) was the official name of Vietnam at this time.
	1890–1920	Flag of emperors Thành Thái, Duy Tân and Khải Định	A red field with a single yellow stripe. Referred to as the Long tinh or Dragon Star Flag.
	1920–1945	Flag of emperors Khải Định and Bảo Đại	A yellow field with a single red stripe. Referred to as the Long tinh or Dragon Star Flag.
	8 May–30 August 1945	Flag of emperor Bảo Đại	A yellow field with a single red stripe. Referred to as the Long tinh or Dragon Star Flag.

==== Personal standards of emperors ====
Flag	Duration	Use	Name/Description
	1922–1945	Personal standard of emperors Khải Định and Bảo Đại.	Flag ratio: 2:3.
	1941?–1945	Royal fanion (Cờ Nhà Vua) of the Nguyễn dynasty.	The "flag of yellow and dragon" (黃龍旗, Hoàng-long kì) or the "Son of Heaven flag" (天子旗, Thiên-tử kì). Flag ratio is 1:2.
	1941?–1945	Imperial standard of the Nguyễn dynasty.	Flag ratio: 1:2.
	1948–1955	Personal standard of State Chief Bảo Đại.	Flag ratio: 2:3. Influences:

=== Coats of arms ===
Coat of arms of the Nguyễn dynasty depicting a dragon.

Variant coat of arms of the Nguyễn dynasty.

=== Heirloom seals ===
Đại Việt quốc Nguyễn Chúa vĩnh trấn chi bảo (大越國阮𪐴永鎮之寶, "Seal of the eternal government of the Nguyễn Lords of the Kingdom of Great(er) Viêt") written in seal script.

Đại Nam thụ thiên vĩnh mệnh truyền quốc tỷ (大南受天永命傳國璽, "The Great South has the eternal Mandate of Heaven, jade seal for the transmission of the legacy of the Empire") written in seal script.

== See also ==
- Đăng đàn cung
- Imperial Clan Court
- Tomb of Gia Long
- Tomb of Tự Đức
- Tomb of Dục Đức
- Tomb of Khải Định

== Sources ==
- Smith, R. B. (1974). "Politics and Society in Viet-Nam during the Early Nguyen Period (1802–62)". The Journal of the Royal Asiatic Society of Great Britain and Ireland. 106 (2): 153–169. doi:10.1017/S0035869X00131995. S2CID 155581972.
