= Thứ phi Hoàng Phi Yến =

Vietnamese shrine

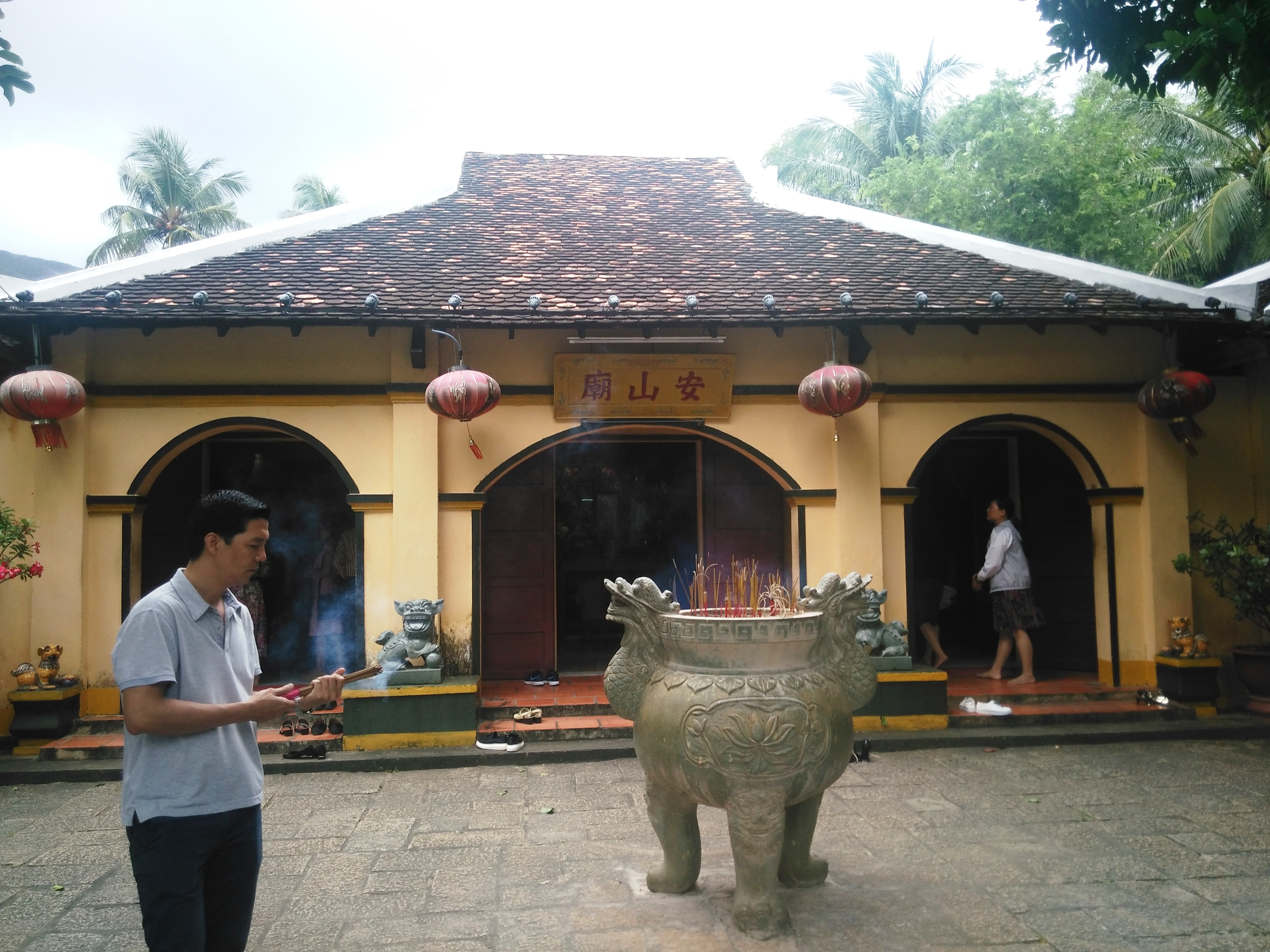
An Sơn Temple, the place to worship Imperial Concubine Phi Yến in Côn Đảo

Imperial Concubine Phi Yến (Vietnamese: Thứ phi Hoàng Phi Yến), born Lê Thị Răm (Hán-Nôm: 黎氏菻), is a controversial local legend of the Côn Đảo archipelago, Bà Rịa–Vũng Tàu province. According to the legend she was the concubine of Lord Nguyễn Phúc Ánh and gave birth to a son known as Prince Cải, she advised Lord Ánh not to ask foreigners for help as that would make their victory less glorious and might cause issues in future, these comments caused Lord Ánh to be suspicious of her motives and to lock her up in a cave. Later when their toddler asked where his mother was he killed him. She grieved their son and later committed suicide as she was touched by a butcher during a vegetarian festival seeing it as "harming her honour as a concubine". This caused the villagers of Côn Đảo to hold a festival in her honour every year.

In early 2022 the festival honouring her death was recognised as an intangible part of the national cultural heritage (di sản văn hóa phi vật thể quốc gia) of Vietnam. However, historians did not receive this move by the government of Vietnam well.

Historians and Nguyễn dynasty scholars pointed out there are quite a number of inconsistencies with this story, namely that the island of Côn Lôn where Nguyễn Phúc Ánh fled to is actually Koh Rong in southern Cambodia and not Côn Đảo, also at the time that the story supposedly took place Nguyễn Phúc Ánh was a lord (主, Chúa) or king (國王, Quốc vương) and wasn't yet elevated to the status of Emperor (皇帝, Hoàng đế), something which he would only become in 1802 after crowning himself the Gia Long Emperor. So, it would make no sense for him to have a Thứ phi Hoàng in the 1780s. In reality the actual origins of her story are likely a localised version of the Goddess Thủy Long (Thủy Long thần nữ).

Representatives of the Nguyễn Phúc / Nguyễn Phước clan have described the story as insulting the legacy and character of their ancestor and in April 2022 they petitioned to revoke the status of her festival as an intangible cultural heritage. In June 2022 the Ministry of Culture, Sports and Tourism responded and stated that the festival had to be renamed to honour Bà Phi Yến (Mrs. Phi Yến) instead of Thứ phi Hoàng Phi Yến to ensuring that "the principle of respecting the subject community of the heritage, avoiding misunderstanding about history, or causing conflicts among communities in the great unity of the Vietnamese people".

== Legend ==
In 1783, after losing to the Tây Sơn army, Lord Nguyễn Ánh had to cross the sea with his wife, children, family, and his subordinates. They fled to the island of Côn Lôn (which according to the legend is today Côn Đảo) to take refuge. On the island Nguyễn Ánh created three villages: An Hải, An Hội, and Cỏ Ống. To fight the Tây Sơn Rebellion, Nguyễn Ánh planned to send his eldest son, Prince Hội An (whose nickname is Prince Cải), as part of a diplomatic mission to France to request for help to fight the rebels. Mrs. Phi Yên (whose real name is Lê Thị Răm) advised that fighting the Tây Sơn dynasty is a domestic affair and that he shouldn't ask foreigners for help as if he would beat the Tây Sơn with foreign help that the victory wouldn't be glorious. And that he would have trouble later with asking foreigners for assistance.

Not only did Nguyễn Ánh refuse to listen to her advice, he also got angry her and suspected that she was secretly colluding with the Tây Sơn rebels. Because of his suspicions of her he planned to kill her. Thanks to the intercession of the Gods he imprisoned her in a cave on the small island of Côn Lôn, later that mountain was named Hòn Bà.

When the Tây Sơn army attacked Côn Lôn island, Nguyễn Ánh was forced to flea to the nearby Phú Quốc island. Prince Cải, Phi Yên's son who was only 4 years old at the time asked if his mother could accompany them, enraged at his request Nguyễn Ánh cast the prince into the sea killing him. Later Prince Cải's body drifted to Cỏ Ống beach, where local villagers would find his body and bury it.

After being rescued from the cave by the villagers and learning about the death of her son, Mrs. Phi Yên she was very sad. She stood in front of her child's grave for a long time and cried, the villagers found the situation so pitiful that they sang a song:

"The wind brought the brassicaceae plant back to the sky, the laksa leaves remained to suffer the bitter life."

(Gió đưa cây Cải về trời, Rau Răm ở lại chịu đời đắng cay.)

And the people of Côn Đảo believe that this song comes from such a heartbreaking historical story.

In the 10th lunar month of 1785, An Hải village held a festival to make vegetarian sacrifices to the gods. They asked Phi Yên to attend for more solemnity. That night, she was "corrupted" by the butcher Biện Thi, he just touched her arm which startled her and she began to loudly shout, to preserve her reputation, she cut off her own arm and then committed suicide because it was supposed to be the dignity of a concubine to remain untouched. The villagers took care of her funeral and built a shrine to worship her as người phụ nữ "Trung Trinh Tiết Liệt".

Since the death of Thứ phi Hoàng Phi Yến on the 18th day of the 10th month of the yin calendar in 1785 (18/10 âm lịch năm 1785) the people of An Hải (what is today Côn Đảo) admired the faithful and chaste woman so much that they built a shrine in her honour to worship her, this shrine was called An Sơn temple (An Sơn miếu). The villagers would organise an annual mourning festival on the anniversary of death which became the Lễ giỗ Bà Thứ phi Hoàng Phi Yến festival.

== Temple ==
Miếu Bà Phi Yến (Mrs. Phi Yến Temple), also known as the An Sơn Miếu (An Sơn Temple), is a temple located in the Côn Đảo district. According to legend the temple was originally built in 1785 to honour the legendary figure. In 1861, after the French colonialists occupied the island, they decided to move the entire population to mainland French Cochinchina to build a prison, so the temple gradually fell into disrepair. In 1958, the people on the island rebuilt to become a spacious temple on the old temple's foundation. In 1981 the temple was completely rebuilt.

The total area of the temple is 4200 square meters, the overall construction is built in the shape of the character Nhất, but since 1958 the temple was remodeled many times to this day. Outside of the temple there is a stone stele recording the legend of Bà Phi Yến and Prince Cải.

The entrance to the temple is a large cement-brick courtyard which leads to a "circular cement lake" (hồ nước hình tròn bằng xi măng), inside of the "lake" there is a rockery that is the symbol of the cave where Bà Phi Yến was supposedly imprisoned by Nguyễn Phúc Ánh. The rockery is a celestial altar connecting yin and yang, heaven and earth, and features two flagpoles placed symmetrical, one with the national flag of Vietnam and one with the five elements flag.

Between the years 1970 and 1972 there was straight dirt road leading from Hàng Dương beach to Bà An Hải temple where young South Vietnamese civil servants learned to drive a Scout car.

Miếu Bà Phi Yến has been declared to be a provincial-level cultural relic by the People's Committee of the Bà Rịa–Vũng Tàu province on 8 April 2009.

== Festival ==
Mrs. Phi Yến's death anniversary festival in Côn Đảo (Vietnamese: Lễ hội giỗ bà Phi Yến ở Côn Đảo) is an annual festival held on the 17th and 18th day of the 10th month of the lunar calendar. Every year during these two days both locals from Côn Đảo and tourists gather at the An Sơn Temple. During the ceremony traditional music is played while representatives of the Côn Đảo district dressed in traditional clothing sacrifice local products such as local flowers (địa phương như hương hoa), five fruits (ngũ quả), sticky rice (xôi), tea (chè), Etc. Then the celebrant reads the vows and prays for good fortune; wishing the country and its people to have peace and happiness.

After the ceremony cultural and artistic activities are done at the island such as sports, folk games, amateur folk music, and theatrical performances recreating the virtuous life of Mrs. Phi Yến.

The festival is organised every year by the Communist Party Committee, the People's Army of Vietnam, and the government of Côn Đảo with participation of the locals.

The festival for Mrs. Phi Yến's death anniversary is the first intangible cultural heritage of the Bà Rịa–Vũng Tàu province recognised as a national intangible cultural heritage by the Ministry of Culture, Sports and Tourism.

== Scholarship and debunking ==
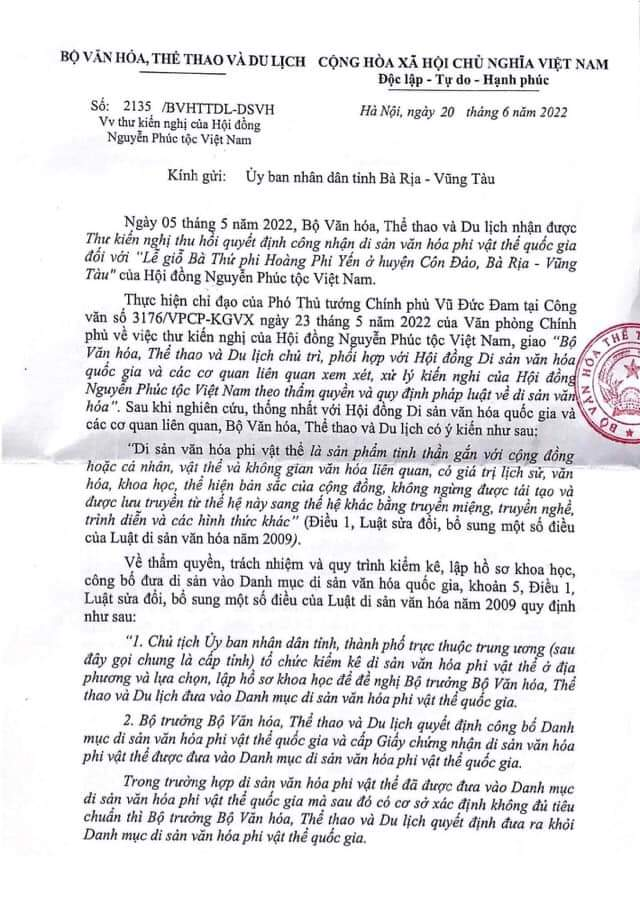
Response from the Ministry of Culture, Sports and Tourism to the request by the Hội đồng Nguyễn Phúc tộc Việt Nam to revoke the festival's status as intangible cultural heritage (20 June 2022).

=== 1942 ===
During the Nguyễn dynasty period itself the historical accuracy of the legend was already being called into question. In 1942 Tri Tân magazine (tạp chí Tri Tân) ran a story entitled "History of Discourse: A Letter from Huế" (Sử học luận đàm: Một bức thư Huế) where Tôn Thất Dương Kỵ noted that there isn't any historical evidence to support that Lord Nguyễn Phúc Ánh ever went to Côn Lôn island.

According to Tôn Thất Dương Kỵ, after losing the citadel of Saigon to the Tây Sơn rebels in 1783 lord Nguyễn Phúc Ánh fled to Phú Quốc island. As he was pursued by the Tây Sơn army he fled further to an island called Koh Rong, not Côn Lôn island as many historical documents record. Because Chinese characters do not have an R consonant, it is transliterated into an L consonant (meaning that "Koh Rong" became "Côn Lôn"); Ancient books also often used the word "Côn Lôn" to refer to the islands in general. According to Tôn Thất Dương Kỵ, at that time, Côn Lôn belonged to the waters controlled by the Tây Sơn rebels, and was too far from Phú Quốc.

=== 2022 ===
On 26 April 2022 the Thanh Niên newspaper reported on the worshipping of bà thứ phi Hoàng Phi Yến at the Tùng Thiện Vương Temple in Huế, Thừa Thiên Huế province. The Hội đồng Nguyễn Phúc tộc Việt Nam organised a scholarly discussion on "An Sơn Temple and Mrs. Phi Yến in Côn Đảo, a matter of legends to heritage records" (An Sơn miếu và bà Phi Yến ở Côn Đảo, vấn đề từ truyền thuyết đến hồ sơ di sản). After the discussion, the Hội đồng Nguyễn Phúc tộc Việt Nam proposed to the Ministry of Culture, Sports and Tourism to revoke the decision to recognise the national intangible cultural heritage (Di sản văn hóa phi vật thể) for the death anniversary of the imperial concubine Phi Yến. The Hội đồng Nguyễn Phúc tộc Việt Nam (also written as the Hội đồng Nguyễn Phước tộc Việt Nam) is an organisation of the Nguyễn Phúc clan.

The seminar had the presence and participation of scholars about history, culture, and the Nguyễn dynasty period from Huế and Hanoi, including the former chairman of the Historical Science Society of Thừa Thiên – Huế (Hội Khoa học Lịch sử Thừa Thiên – Huế). The researchers included Nguyễn Xuân Hoa (former director of the Department of Culture and Sports of Thừa Thiên Huế province), Nguyễn Quang Trung Tiến (former dean of the Faculty of History, Huế University of Science), Assoc. Prof. Dr. Nguyễn Văn Đăng (former dean of the Faculty of History, Huế University of Science), Trần Đại Vinh (former President of the Folk Arts Association of Thừa Thiên Huế)， Nguyễn Đắc Xuân, and Dr. Nguyễn Xuân Diện (Institute of Hán-Nôm Studies, Vietnam Academy of Social Sciences), among others. The seminar received 16 reports from researchers, of which 3 were presented at the seminar and more than 10 comments were presented. The scholars concluded that Thứ phi Hoàng Phi Yến is a fictional character.

"The Hội đồng trị sự Nguyễn Phúc tộc Việt Nam has checked the genealogy of the Nguyễn Phúc clan and the Đại Nam liệt truyện, and there is absolutely no one who is a concubine of sovereign Gia Long named Lê Thị Răm and whose name is Phi Yến. Similarly, in the imperial genealogy, there is no record of Prince Cải's name, who is the son of sovereign Gia Long." said Associate Professor Dr. Nguyễn Phước Bửu Nam.

(Original Vietnamese)

"Hội đồng trị sự Nguyễn Phúc tộc Việt Nam đã rà soát Nguyễn Phúc tộc thế phả và Đại Nam liệt truyện thì hoàn toàn không có ai là thứ phi vua Gia Long tên Lê Thị Răm và có tên thụy là Phi Yến. Tương tự, trong gia phả hoàng tộc cũng không ghi chép tên của hoàng tử Cải là con của vua Gia Long", PGS-TS Nguyễn Phước Bửu Nam cho biết.

— Vì sao kiến nghị thu hồi Di sản quốc gia Lễ giỗ bà Phi Yến? (Why propose to revoke the national heritage status of Phi Yến's death anniversary?) by Bùi Ngọc Long, Báo Thanh Niên Online (27 April 2022).

They noted that Thứ phi Hoàng Phi Yến is not recorded in the official history of the Nguyễn dynasty, nor is she found in the genealogy of the imperial family of the Nguyễn dynasty (Hoàng tộc triều Nguyễn). The records show that both French scholars and published studies prove that the imperial concubine Phi Yến (named Lê Thị Răm) and Prince Cải (also known as Prince Hội An, or hoàng tử Hội An) are both fictional characters that do not appear in the history of the Nguyễn dynasty.

According to folklore researcher Nguyễn Thanh Lợi, the legend of Phi Yến originated from the belief of worshiping Thiên Y Ana in Central Vietnam, and when brought to the southern region, it was integrated with the belief of worshiping the goddess Thủy Long (Thủy Long thần nữ), turning it into a local custom. Later, it was historicalised through the image of Phi Yến and became associated with Nguyen Phúc Ánh's presence on Côn Đảo during his days of exile, as his presence left a lot of marks on the area.

Researcher Nguyễn Xuân Hoa also noted that at the time Nguyễn Phúc Ánh was a Nguyễn King (Nguyễn Vương) and not an Emperor yet, so historically it wouldn't make any sense for her to have been given the title of "Thứ phi".

It has further been noted that the Côn Lôn noted in the Đại Nam thực lục where Nguyễn Phúc Ánh stayed during his fight against the Tây Sơn rebels is actually the island of Cổ Long in southern Cambodia near Hà Tiên province and Phú Quốc. Something which was first correctly identified by French scholar Charles B. Maybon during the 20th century, in his 1930 book Lectures sur l'histoire moderne et contemporaine du pays d'Annam de 1428 à 1926 (Bài giảng lịch sử An Nam cận đại và hiện đại từ năm 1428 đến năm 1926).

The Hội đồng trị sự Nguyễn Phước tộc Việt Nam wrote in their petition that because the Nguyễn dynasty was so recent that the records and histories of the dynasty are well-preserved and don't let much open for misinterpretation. So, they claimed that the recognition by the government of the death anniversary of bà thứ phi Hoàng Phi Yến as a traditional cultural relic belonging to An Sơn Temple in the Côn Đảo District is "is insulting to the heroic spirit and image of Emperor Gia Long, the founding monarch of the Nguyễn dynasty as well as the Nguyễn Phúc clan".

On 26 April 2022 the Hội đồng Nguyễn Phúc tộc Việt Nam submitted their request to the Ministry of Culture, Sports and Tourism.

In May 2022 the Ministry of Culture, Sports and Tourism responded that they would consider revoking the intangible cultural heritage status based on the recommendations of the Hội đồng Nguyễn Phúc tộc Việt Nam.

== June 2022 review by the Ministry of Culture, Sports and Tourism ==
At the end of May 2022 deputy prime minister Vũ Đức Đam asked the Ministry of Culture, Sports and Tourism to deliberate with the Hội đồng Nguyễn Phúc tộc Việt Nam from the Thừa Thiên Huế province. On 16 June 2022 these parties discussed the status of the festival. They reviewed the status of the festival as an intangible cultural heritage and decided that it did meet all criteria. However, the Ministry of Culture, Sports and Tourism also noted that they would have to review the dossier for historical accuracy, in their decision they noted that the local cultural heritage and the importance of the story to the local identity of the community of Côn Đảo was taken into account.

The Ministry of Culture, Sports and Tourism noted that people's religious practice is protected by law, and does not mean to honour or recognise an actual historical figure or event.

The Ministry said that the People's Committee of Bà Rịa-Vũng Tàu province should do what it can to respect historical accuracy. They recommended that the local government should explain the mythical nature of the story and explain that it's only a local folk legend and not a historically accurate story. At the temple the steles and information signs should be updated to reflect these recommendations and that they should omit any new elements to the historical story.

But as the name of festival may "be misleading about a historical figure" (có thể gây hiểu nhầm về một nhân vật lịch sử) which is why they also recommend that the festival should be renamed to something like lễ giỗ Bà (Old woman's death anniversary observation), giỗ Bà (Old woman's death anniversary), giỗ bà Phi Yến (Mrs. Phi Yến's death anniversary), giỗ bà Hoàng Phi Yến (Mrs. Hoàng Phi Yến's death anniversary)...

== See also ==
- Vietnamese folk religion
- Vietnamese mythology
