= Abdication of Bảo Đại =

1945 renunciation of the throne of Vietnam

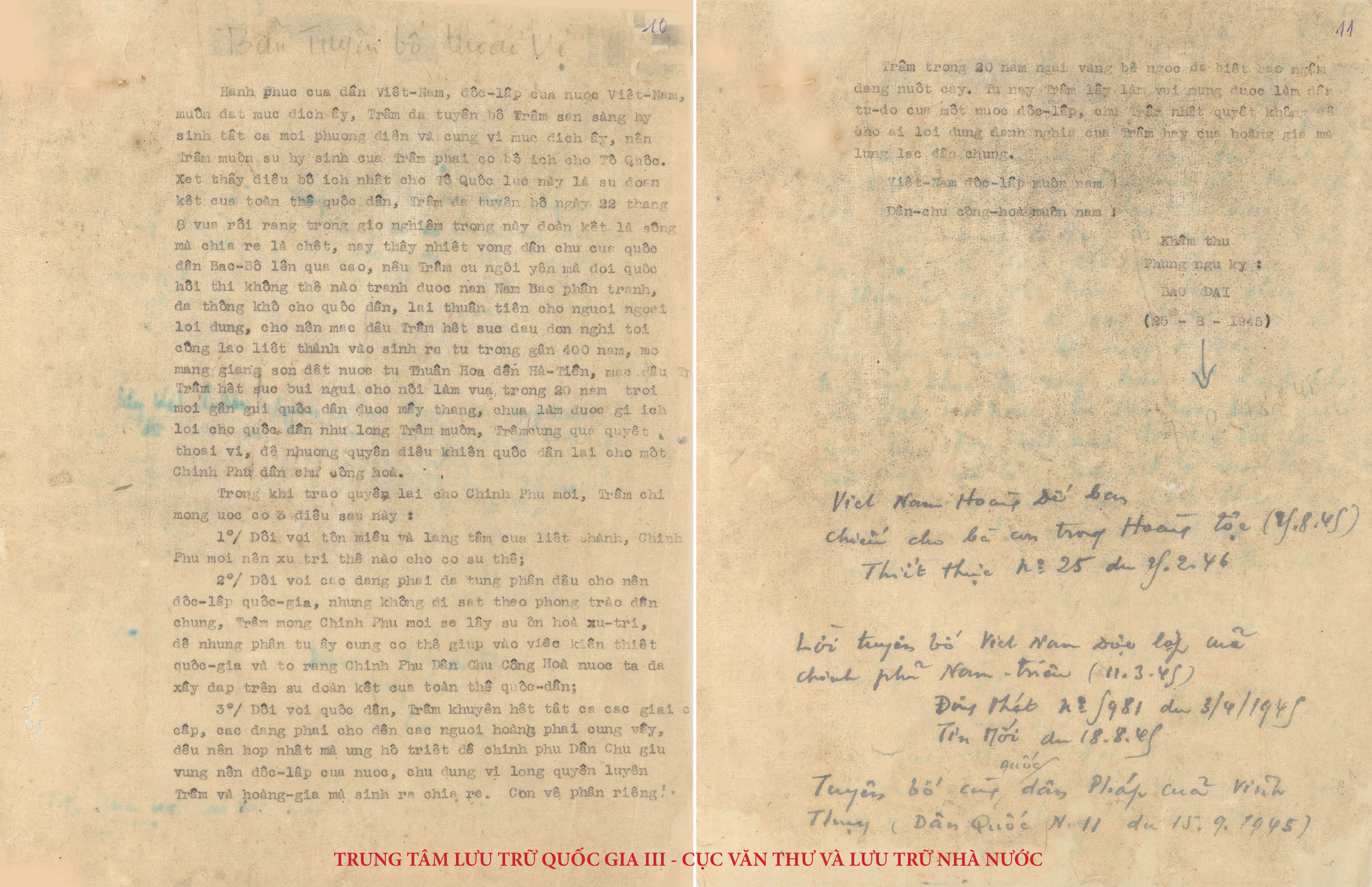
Abdication statement of Bảo Đại, signed 25 August 1945

The abdication of Bảo Đại (Vietnamese: Chiếu thoái vị của Hoàng Đế Bảo Đại) took place on 25 August 1945, in response to the August Revolution. It marked the end of the 143-year reign of the Nguyễn dynasty, a dynasty under the House of Nguyễn Phúc, and marked the end of the Vietnamese monarchy. The fall of the Nguyễn dynasty led to the end of the Empire of Vietnam cabinet of Prime Minister Trần Trọng Kim, a Japanese puppet government.

A public abdication ceremony was held on 30 August 1945, in which Emperor Bảo Đại handed power over to the Viet Minh. Following his abdication, Bảo Đại became "citizen Vĩnh Thụy", an advisor to the government of the Democratic Republic of Vietnam (DRV).

On 14 June 1949, the French united French Cochinchina with the protectorates of Annam and Tonkin to form the associated State of Vietnam within the French Union, and reinstalled Bảo Đại as head of state. The State of Vietnam was a semi-constitutional monarchy, and Bảo Đại was its monarch, but he was called the Chief of State (Quốc trưởng). His position was supposed to only be temporary until the country would have an elected constitutional parliament. On 26 October 1955, three days after a fraudulent referendum, Prime Minister Ngo Dinh Diem proclaimed the formation of the Republic of Vietnam as the successor state to the State of Vietnam, with himself as its first President. This event marked the end of the rule of Bảo Đại.

== Background ==
Vietnam briefly regained its independence from France in 1945, when Emperor Bảo Đại rescinded the 1884 Treaty of Huế. This (temporarily) ended the French protectorates over Annam and Tonkin and created the Empire of Vietnam, which was a puppet state of the Empire of Japan. In response to French and Japanese oppression of the Vietnamese people as well as the Vietnamese famine of 1944–1945, Ho Chi Minh’s communist Viet Minh (League for the Independence of Vietnam) launched a general uprising against both French and Japanese colonial rule in Vietnam on 14 August 1945.

On 21 August 1945, the Viet Minh sent a telegram requesting the abdication of Bảo Đại. Phạm Khắc Hòe received the telegram and relayed its contents to the emperor. The telegram, sent by “A committee of patriots representing all parties and all segments of the population”, contained the following message: “With the determination of the entire nation who are willing to sacrifice to protect the independence of the nation, we respectfully ask his Imperial Majesty to make a historic gesture of renouncing his power”. It also set an ultimatum of 12 hours for Bảo Đại to abdicate, otherwise they couldn't guarantee that he or his family would survive the August Revolution.

Bảo Đại was surprised by the telegram, as he claimed to be unaware of the revolution and its leaders. He also claimed to be unaware of other significant problems in Vietnam, such as the devastating famine that had killed possibly millions of his subjects in Annam and Tonkin. He attempted to contact United States President Harry S. Truman, Generalissimo Chiang Kai-shek, King George VI, and General Charles de Gaulle for help, but none of them answered. A young tutor of Crown Prince Bảo Long begged for Bảo Đại to take shelter in the Imperial Tomb, but he refused. A small French military squad entitled "Lambda", consisting of 6 men led by French Army captain Castelnat, parachuted 28 kilometers from Huế in an attempt to prevent Bảo Đại from abdicating. However, they were captured by the Viet Minh as soon as their parachutes hit the ground. Bảo Đại later received a second telegram from Hanoi, asking for his abdication.

It is not known with certainty who convinced Bảo Đại to abdicate, although Huỳnh Thúc Kháng or Phạm Khắc Hòe were likely involved. The latter compared Bảo Đại’s situation to that of King Louis XVI of France. Bảo Đại sent a telegram to the Viet Minh, accepting their terms. The telegram contained the following text: "In response to the gentlemen's call, I am ready to resign. In the time of making decisions for the nation, to be united is vital and to be divided is a death sentence. I am willing to sacrifice everything for solidarity to be realised and I expect the leaders of this committee to come to Huế as soon as possible for the transfer of power." The Viet Minh then sent a delegation to Huế to receive the statement of abdication from Emperor Bảo Đại.

Nguyễn Kỳ Nam claimed that Emperor Bảo Đại was indeed aware of the Viet Minh before the revolution, and that a Japanese general had alerted him, claiming that he had gathered intelligence about the secret organisation of Viet Minh revolutionaries all over Vietnam. He reported that Bảo Đại had refused the offer by the Japanese to eliminate the communists because he believed that enough bloodshed had already occurred during the war.

== Abdication ==
The imperial edict ending the Nguyễn dynasty was composed by Emperor Bảo Đại, with the help of Prince Nguyễn Phúc Vĩnh Cẩn and Phạm Khắc Hòe on the night of 22 August 1945 at the Kien Trung Palace, within the Imperial City of Huế. The next morning, when the representatives of the provisional government of the DRV (Trần Huy Liệu and Huy Cận) arrived at the palace, Bảo Đại at first gave the declaration to Trần Huy Liệu, but Liệu instead convinced him to hold a formal ceremony announcing his abdication.

Along with the edict declaring his abdication, Emperor Bảo Đại also promulgated an edict which was directed at the imperial family of the Nguyễn dynasty, reminding them of his attachment to the philosophy that “the people are paramount”, and that he would rather be merely a citizen of an independent country than the puppet ruler of an enslaved country. He called on the members of the imperial family to support the government of the DRV, and that they should also work to preserve Vietnam’s independence. The edicts also made it clear that he was transmitting his mandate voluntarily rather than due to any form of coercion.

Bảo Đại’s abdication was officially announced on 25 August 1945, and the August Revolution was proclaimed to be successful. President Ho Chi Minh, along with the Central Committee of the Communist Party and the National Committee for the Liberation of the People returned to Hanoi. Bảo Đại’s abdication also symbolised the end of a military government and the beginning of a civilian government for the DRV.

== Ceremony ==
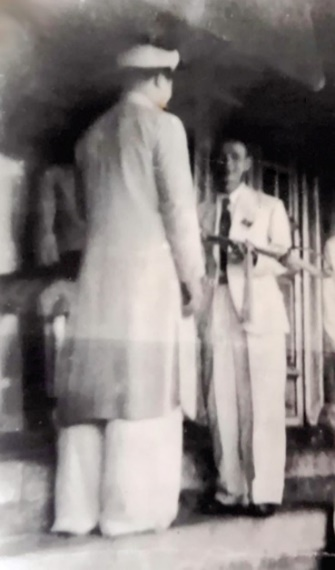
A photograph taken during the abdication ceremony

The abdication ceremony was held on 30 August 1945 outside the Meridian Gate, the main gate to the Imperial City of Huế. Organised by Phạm Khắc Hòe, around 50,000 people attended the ceremony. The three representatives of the DRV that attended the ceremony to formalise the abdication of Emperor Bảo Đại were Trần Huy Liệu, Nguyễn Lương Bằng, and Huy Cận. The Meridian Gate was chosen because it was the venue for the most important political events of the Nguyễn dynasty, such as coronation ceremonies.

During the ceremony, Bảo Đại was dressed in his imperial costume (hoàng bào) and wore a yellow turban. According to his memoirs, the audience was in complete silence while Bảo Đại read the proclamation, all of them appeared to be shocked and bewildered. In contrast, Trần Huy Liệu claimed in his memoirs that the crowd was cheering in excitement. Bảo Đại gave his regalia to the representatives of the government of the DRV, symbolically passing the Mandate of Heaven over to the government of the DRV. Bảo Đại handed the hoàng Đế chi bảo (ceremonial seal of the state) over to the 26 year old Trần Huy Liệu, who found it heavy to carry, and the jade-encrusted silver "Sword of the State" to Huy Cận. Bảo Đại transferred other imperial objects to the delegates of the DRV, outside of the ceremony.

After handing over the sword, Bảo Đại asked the delegation if he could also receive something from the delegation to commemorate this event. The delegates were surprised with the request and quickly discussed what to do. Huy Cận improvised and pulled out a red badge with a yellow star that the Thừa Thiên Huế Revolutionary People's Committee gave to members of the delegation, and pinned it to Bảo Đại’s chest. He then loudly proclaimed "Xin đồng bào hoan nghênh công dân Vĩnh Thụy" (Welcome, fellow citizen Vĩnh Thụy).

After the delegates had received the ceremonial items, they held them up so that the people of Huế could observe them. Trần Huy Liệu noted how he and the other delegates had never held more than a few grams of gold before, and were surprised by how heavy the golden objects were, making them exhausted while trying to show them to the people. Trần Huy Liệu then proceeded to read a speech to the audience. In the speech, he declared that the reign of the Nguyễn dynasty — and over a millennium of monarchy in total — had finally come to an end.

The two men responsible for lowering the flags of the Nguyễn dynasty and of the Empire of Vietnam, and hoisting the flag of the DRV — Đặng Văn Việt and Nguyễn Thế Lương — later became prominent officers in the People's Army of Vietnam.

== Abdication document/speech ==
=== According to Vietnam: Blood and Fire ===
English translation:

"Projection for:

Happiness for the Vietnamese people.

Independence for the country of Vietnam.

Wanting to achieve these goals, I have declared that I am ready to make all the necessary sacrifices, and I want my sacrifices to benefit our ancestral lands.

Considering that the unity of the entire nation at this time is essential, I have declared that this past 22 August during this most serious hour in our National History: Unity is to survive. Division is to perish.

Now seeing the high-rise of the democratic expectations in the north of the nation, if I keep waiting for the creation of a National Assembly, I am afraid that it will be difficult to avoid the South-North divide of our nation, causing suffering for the nation. This situation would be great for outsiders to take advantage of.

Although I think painfully about the work of my ancestors gave birth to death for nearly 400 years to expand our country from Thuận Hóa to Hà Tiên. Although I think sadly about the past 20 years I was in a situation where I could not do anything significant for the country as I had wanted to do, I am now determined to give up control of the nation to a Republican and Democratic Government. After abdicating, I only wish for 3 things:

- For the new government to keep my ancestral shrines and tomb of former emperor dignified.

- As for the parties that have fought for the National Independence but do not follow the popular movement, I hope that the new Government will be gentle and treat them well so that they can also participate and contribute to national construction and to show that the new regime builds on the unity of the entire nation.

- I hope that all the parties, social classes, and the people of the imperial family should unite and fully support the government of the Democratic Republic (of Vietnam) to maintain the independence of the country.

Particularly, for the past 20 years of the throne, I had to bitterly swallow the reality of dependence many times. From now on, I am happy to be a citizen of an independent country, and decide not to let anyone take advantage of my name or that of the imperial family and play the nation as a puppet.

Ten thousand years of Vietnamese independence!

Ten thousand years to the Democratic Republic (of Vietnam)!

Edict: BẢO ĐẠI."

— Vietnam: Blood and Fire - Pages 38, 39, and 40 - Mai Lĩnh Publishing House, 1954 (Việt Nam Máu Lửa, trang 38, 39, 40 - Nghiêm Kế Tố - Nhà xuất bản Mai Lĩnh 1954.)

=== According to Bảo Đại, Dragon of Vietnam ===
English translation:

"For the happiness of the Vietnamese people,

For Vietnam's independence,

In order to achieve these two purposes, I declared my willingness to sacrifice everything, and wished that my sacrifice would benefit the ancestral homeland.

Commenting that the solidarity of all our compatriots at this moment is a necessity for our ancestral homeland, on 23 August, I repeated to all of our people: At this decisive and important moment of our history, unity means living, division means death.

Showing the accelerating democratic momentum in the North of our country, I fear that a dispute between the North and the South is unavoidable, if I wait after a referendum to decide to step down. I understand that, if there is such a dispute that brings the whole country into painful chaos, it will only benefit the invaders to take advantage of.

I cannot help but pity when thinking of the heroes who have fought for over four hundred years to expand the realm from Thuận Hóa to Hà Tiên. I cannot help but regret that during the twenty years of being on the throne, I could do nothing to benefit the country in any significant manner.

Even so, and strong in my beliefs, I have decided to step down to empower the government of the Democratic Republic (of Vietnam). Before leaving the throne, I had only three things that I ask:

- First: I request the new government to preserve imperial mausoleums and temples.

- Second: I ask the new government to treat the parties, groups, and unions that have fought for the country's independence, although not following the same democratic direction, in this way, they can participate in the construction of the country, and prove that the new regime has been built on the decisive solidarity of the entire people.

- Third: I request that all parties, groups, people from all walks of life, as well as the entire imperial family to unite and work closely together to unconditionally support the government of the Democratic Republic (of Vietnam), in order to strengthen the movement towards national independence.

As for me, during my twenty years on the throne, I have been through so much bitterness. I would rather be a citizen of a free country, than the sovereign of an enslaved country. From now on I am happy to be a free citizen, in an independent country. I will no longer allow anyone to take advantage of my name, or imperial title, to sow divisions among our fellow citizens.

Ten thousand years to the independence of Vietnam,

Ten thousand years to the Democratic Republic of Vietnam,

Edict. Bảo Đại. Huế, Kiến Trung Palace, 25 August 1945"

— Bảo Đại, Dragon of Vietnam (Bảo Đại, Con Rồng Việt Nam), Nguyễn Phước Tộc Xuất Bản, 1990. Pages 186, 187, and 188.

== Edict directed at the imperial family of the Nguyễn dynasty ==
Along with the "official abdication" (Chiếu thoái vị), Emperor Bảo Đại also issued another document (imperial edict) for the imperial family attached to it, containing the following text:

English translation:

"It has been 399 years since the day when our great ancestor entered the lands of Thuận Hóa up until this day. In the past four centuries, our family has experienced many dangerous hardships and have endured. But for the sake of our nation the time has come to pass over the throne. For me, today is the day.

Our family has had this precious inheritance for nearly 400 years, and in a single moment I gave this all up. I know that for the people in the imperial family it must be painful and pitiful to learn about this.

Song Trẫm said that: It is only a fleeting sentiment for a moment, afterwards, everyone is ready to calm down, ready to see and see far, it is after this philosophy that I created the three-word slogan "Dân Vi Quý" as the slogan of the new regime after declaring "the imperial throne will strive for the happiness of the people". However, now I am determined to step down to deliver the fate of the country's life to a government that is eligible to mobilise. All forces of the country are being mobilised to maintain the independence of the country and to strive for the happiness of the people.

"Independence of the country, The happiness of the people" (Độc lập của nước, Hạnh phúc của dân), because of those eight words, in the past eight decades, tens of thousands of people have lost their lives for this struggle or were sentenced to prison.

With respect to the sacrifices made by those heroes, those thousands of unnamed soldiers, for them I shall abdicate.

So I want the imperial family, after hearing word of my abdication, to let the country rise above the love for the dynasty, to unite with the entire nation to support the government of the Democratic Republic of Vietnam and to maintain independence. For the sake of our Fatherland. That is a noble and sincere way to keep the spirit of the Chinese words written by Song Trẫm and the Hiếu written by Liệt Thánh.

Ten thousand years of Independence - Ten thousand years to the Democratic Republic.

Edict: Bảo Đại"

— Bảo Đại, Dragon of Vietnam (Bảo Đại, Con Rồng Việt Nam), Nguyễn Phước Tộc Xuất Bản, 1990. Pages 189 and 190.

== Symbolism ==
=== Transfer of the "Mandate of Heaven" to the Democratic Republic of Vietnam ===
According Brian Michael Jenkins, because of the transfer of the ceremonial seal and sword in 1945 the North Vietnamese believed that they were in possession of the Mandate of Heaven while the Republic of Vietnam did not it. So Jenkins argued that the North Vietnamese and the Viet Cong believed that they would be victorious in the Vietnam War because it was "Heaven's will" as only the government with the Mandate of Heaven was the legitimate ruler of the Vietnamese people. Jenkins wrote that he thinks that the senior leadership of the DRV and the Workers' Party of Vietnam believes this as many were the children of Nguyễn dynasty mandarins and were raised in a Confucian environment, rather than from the Proletariat which is why in his opinion the communists often acted more traditionalist than the South Vietnamese. Jenkins also noted that regarding the Mandate of Heaven being transferred through the passing of the Hoàng Đế chi bảo seal and the Sword of the State presented a strong personal motivation for the Communist leadership to pursue victory over the Republic of Vietnam during the Vietnam War. This was cited as an important psychological reason why the Communists were so determined to keep on fighting and didn't give up during the Vietnam War when fighting the South Vietnamese and their allies (including the United States).

=== Transfer of Nguyễn dynasty treasures to the Democratic Republic of Vietnam ===
Following the abolition of the Nguyễn dynasty in 1945 Emperor Bảo Đại handed over 3000 antiques (weighing around 800 kilograms), including seals, from the Forbidden City and other royal palaces to the revolutionary government of the Democratic Republic of Vietnam following its declaration of independence. As the capital city moved from Huế to Hanoi these antiques were stored at the Vietnam National Museum of History. At the time, only light and small items were selected to move to Hanoi, as heavy items, such as the throne, the Emperor’s palanquin, stone-made screen of the Minh Mạng Emperor, etc. were left in the city of Huế.

Following the transfer of the treasures from the government of the Nguyễn dynasty to the Democratic Republic of Vietnam, an official named Nguyễn Lân commented to Chairman Hồ Chí Minh "In the opinion of many people, it is necessary to melt all the gold and silver taken over from the Nguyễn dynasty to increase the budget to serve the resistance. "In response Hồ Chí Minh asked: "If one day we unify the entire country, what evidence will exist to confirm that we have a tradition of several thousand years of civilisation?" This decision ensured the preservation of Nguyễn dynasty treasures into the present day.

=== Return of the seal and sword to Bảo Đại and ceremony held in Hanoi on 8 March 1953 ===
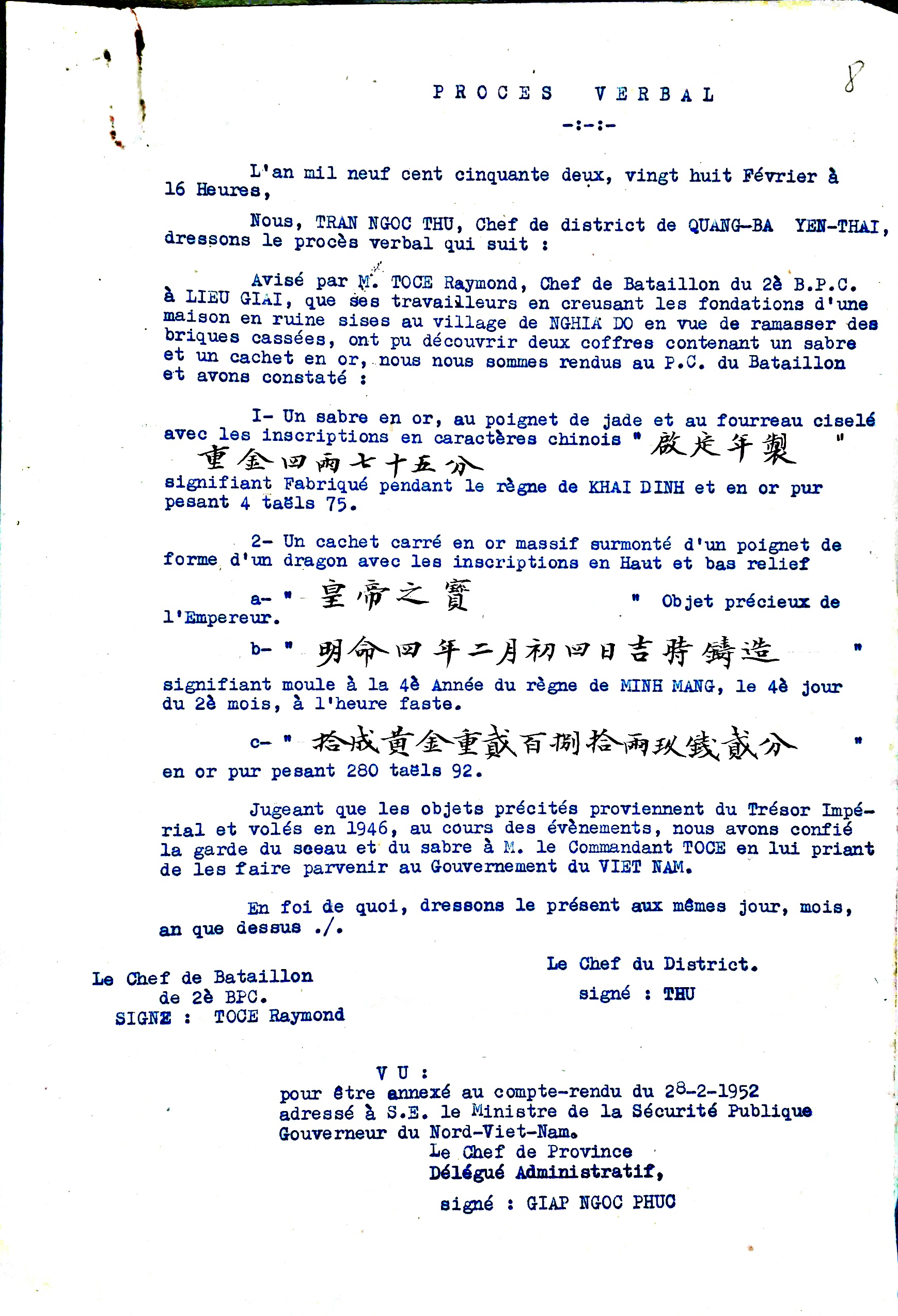
Procès-verbal for the recovery of the items the Bảo Đại Emperor gave to the Democratic Republic of Vietnam during his abdication ceremony (1952)

On 28 February 1952 French General François Jean Antonin Gonzalez de Linarès announced that while digging soil to build a post in Nghĩa Đô in the outskirts of Hanoi, French soldiers saw a 20 liter barrel of kerosene made of iron, inside of this barrel was a gold seal and a broken sword. Ten days later, on 8 March 1952, a full three years after the Élysée Agreements, at the Ba Đình Square, Hanoi, French General François Jean Antonin Gonzalez de Linarès solemnly held a ceremony to hand over the seals and swords to the Chief of State Bảo Đại. The intent of the ceremony by the French was the symbolic return of the Emperor as "the Emperor left, the Emperor returned". Photographs of this event were published in the French magazine Paris Match.

According to the concubine Mộng Điệp the French intended to hand the ceremonial items back to the Nguyễn dynasty on that day, but according to the accounts of Mộng Điệp Bảo Đại was on vacation in the West so he couldn't receive the items, in reality he was in Vietnam in 1953. So Lê Thanh Cảnh arranged to give the ceremonial items to Mộng Điệp in Buôn Mê Thuột, Darlac. Mộng Điệp ordered her servants to have the blade repaired and then sharpened to obfuscate where it was originally broken. When Bảo Đại returned Mộng Điệp said that she has the ceremonial items he gave to Trần Huy Liệu in 1945 and the story of how the French retrieved them. In response Bảo Đại exclaimed "Oh! That's right... In the old days these things went away and saved my life. Now suddenly they come back, maybe I'm about to die!" Due to the ongoing war he didn't dare return the items to Huế and they were later brought to France.

== Aftermath ==
=== Role of Bảo Đại in future Vietnamese politics ===
==== Supreme advisor to the government of the Democratic Republic of Vietnam ====
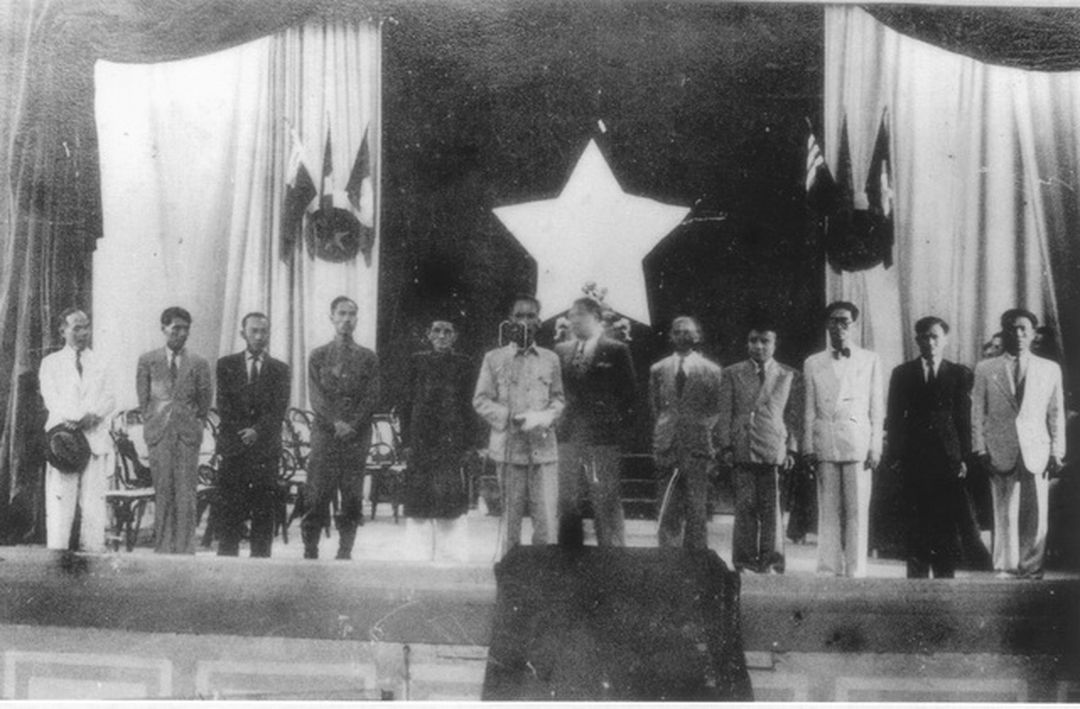
The National assembly of the Democratic Republic of Vietnam on 2 March 1946. Supreme advisor Vĩnh Thụy is located immediately to the left of President Ho Chi Minh.

Following his abdication, Bảo Đại accepted President Ho Chi Minh's offer to become an advisor to the new Vietnamese government in Hanoi. Hồ Chí Minh gave him the title of Conseiller suprême du gouvernement (Supreme Councilor of the Government), but Bảo Đại understood that this position was one that could have easily resulted in his death if he ever stepped out of line. In his memoirs, Bảo Đại noted that the government of the DRV held weekly meetings that would usually last from 09:00 to 13:00. He stated that during these meetings, President Ho Chi Minh just sat and watched without speaking. He noted a time when Phạm Văn Đồng reported that after budgeting, there were only three 25-cent coins left in the state fund. In order to increase the money in the state's coffers, it was proposed that indirect taxes be imposed on consumable products such as chickens, ducks, and buffalo. Bảo Đại then said "Vous oubliez le chien." (You forgot about dogs), which made Ho Chi Minh laugh. Ho Chi Minh hoped that he could make Bảo Đại into the "Souphanouvong of Vietnam", but failed.

During the Chinese occupation of northern Vietnam, many nationalist political groups such as the Việt Quốc and the Việt Cách called upon Bảo Đại to lead the country again. He showed complete indifference to their proposals, and instead indulged in the pursuit of pleasure. When he went to Chongqing on a trip together with a number of communist officers to secure weapons to fight the French, he bluntly announced that he would stay, to which his travel companions pointed out that he only cared for women and playing games. However, in his memoirs, Bảo Đại claimed that he was instructed to stay in China when he received the following telegram: "Sire, everything is fine here, take your time. Besides, you will be very useful to us by staying in China. Don't worry, as soon as it's time to come back, I'll let you know. Rest well for the tasks ahead. Brotherly kisses. Signed: Ho Chi Minh.", which contradicts the other account. As all of his clothes and documents were on the plane, he remarked on Ho Chi Minh being deceitful and was fortunate enough to meet a French-speaking Chinese man in Western clothes whom he met at the airport that allowed him to stay at his place after they bonded over both having studied in Paris. Bảo Đại stayed for around six months in Chongqing, where he met with notable Vietnamese politicians like Lưu Đức Trung, Phạm Văn Bính, Đinh Xuân Quảng, and Bùi Tường Chiểu. On 15 September 1946 he decided to leave Chongqing for Hong Kong.

==== Chief of State of the State of Vietnam ====
The seal of Bảo Đại as Chief of the State of Vietnam. It has the inscription "Quốc-gia Việt-Nam - Đức Bảo Đại - Quốc-trưởng" written in Latin script and "保大國長" (top-to-bottom, right-to-left) in seal script. (1949–1954)

In order to combat the influence of the DRV and the Viet Minh, the French were forced to grant more autonomy to the Vietnamese. French President Vincent Auriol arranged for Bảo Đại to return to Vietnam to lead a new autonomous Vietnamese state, in what the French called the "Bảo Đại solution". On 24 April 1949, Bảo Đại returned from France back to Vietnam. On 14 June 1949, Bảo Đại issued an ordinance giving himself the position of "Chief of State of the State of Vietnam" (Quốc trưởng Quốc gia Việt Nam). In his memoirs, he claimed that he did this to receive more favorable international recognition. Furthermore, in his memoirs he emphasised that his proper title was "Emperor, Chief of State" (Hoàng đế, Quốc trưởng). The position was supposed to only be temporary, until Vietnam would have an elected constitutional parliament.

In 1950, Bảo Đại was given the "Domain of the Crown", which included ethnic minority lands within Vietnam that were directly placed under his rule as Emperor. The Domain of the Crown was officially established on 15 April 1950, and dissolved on 11 March 1955.

During his time as Chief of State, he was often absent from events in Vietnam. He would frequently spend time in Europe or in his domain (specifically in the resort towns of Da Lat, Nha Trang, and Buôn Ma Thuột), rather than attending to his responsibilities as the head of the government.

Bảo Đại was ousted as the Chief of State of the State of Vietnam during a rigged referendum in 1955.

=== Fate of the Hoàng Đế chi bảo seal ===
The imprint of the Hoàng Đế chi bảo seal

Following the French counteroffensive during the First Indochina War the government of Democratic Republic of Vietnam publicly buried the seal and the Sword of the State. The Hoàng Đế chi bảo seal remained buried and when Hanoi was given back to the North Vietnamese they dug the seal up and gave it to the National Museum of Vietnamese History. Later the Hoàng Đế chi bảo was stolen from the museum and it eventually ended up in the hands of concubine Mộng Điệp who intended to hand it, and the sword, back to Emperor Bảo Đại after he would return from France to Dalat. However, Bảo Đại ordered her to bring the regalia to France, where she gave it to Empress Nam Phương in 1953. In 1982 the Crown Prince Bảo Long handed the imperial seal back to his father, Bảo Đại. Since that time, there has been no word as to the whereabouts of the Hoàng Đế chi bảo seal.

=== Fate of the An dân bảo kiếm sword ===
The An dân bảo kiếm blade is straight, it is designed as a typical French sword, but its hilt is decorated with the image of an imperial dragon, a typical Vietnamese decoration. The sword has an inscription on it which indicates that it was created during the reign of the Khải Định Emperor.

Following the French counteroffensive during the First Indochina War the government of Democratic Republic of Vietnam publicly buried the seal and the Sword of the State. After carefully looking for the regalia the French later dug up the sword, which had been broken into three pieces, and then handed these pieces over to the Empress Dowager Từ Cung (the mother of Emperor Bảo Đại) who likely handed it over to the concubine Mộng Điệp.

The An dân bảo kiếm sword was on display at the Guimet National Museum of Asian Arts in 2015. At this exhibition, the sword was described as follows: “Although the shape of this sword is French, the decorations of the sword feature dragons which are a traditional motif of Imperial Vietnam”.

== Controversies ==
In a 4 September 2015 BBC article entitled Did Bảo Đại give a fake sword to the "revolution"?, its author questioned if the sword and seal handed over by Emperor Bảo Đại to the representatives of the Democratic Republic of Vietnam were authentic or even the correct state symbols of the Nguyễn dynasty.

=== Perception of the Việt Minh by the Nguyễn dynasty ===
In his article Phạm Cao Phong noted how just before the abdication both Bảo Đại and those around him were unaware of the Viet Minh and its leadership. After the demands for his abdication were made Emperor Bảo Đại inquired into the demanders but wasn't able to find much information about the Viet Minh.

Briefly before the ceremony Phạm Khắc Hoè met up with Trần Huy Liệu, one of the delegates of the government of the Democratic Republic of Vietnam, on 28 August 1945. According to the memoires of Phạm Khắc Hoè, "Từ triều đình Huế đến chiến khu Việt Bắc" (From the Court of Huế to the Việt Bắc war zone), he was unimpressed by both Liệu and the delegation. As Hoè was the only one with access to the most important items in the imperial palace Phạm Cao Phong argues that this might have given him a motivation to deliberately wish to not provide real objects during the handover ceremony.

Phạm Cao Phong noted that at the time the 30 year old Emperor Bảo Đại was known to be both a hunter and playboy as well as a professional gambler that treated both animals and girls as prey. He used this in analogy that Bảo Đại likely perceived the delegates of the Democratic Republic of Vietnam as "his prey". On 25 August 1945 Bảo Đại met with the delegates and embarrassed them multiple times causing them to deliberate together on multiple occasions. Bảo Đại spoke of Trần Huy Liệu, the head of the delegation and vice chairman of the Committee, as being "a skinny man that looked pathetic, wearing dark glasses to hide his squinting eyes. Furthermore, he described Huy Cận as looking "too trivial" and stated that he felt disappointed by the receivers of his abdication. In his memoirs, Phạm Khắc Hoè mentions that briefly before the abdication ceremony Emperor Bảo Đại said "ça vaut bien le coup alors" (Well worth it then) (Note: Could also be translated as meaning the Vietnamese proverb "Đáng đồng tiền bát gạo - Cũng bõ công làm" (Worth the money of a bowl of rice).) to him, describing it as a profitable gamble.

=== Status of the seal transferred during the ceremony ===
Phạm Cao Phong noted that many contradictory sources exist on which items (sword and seal) were transferred on 30 August 1945, such as reports by Phạm Khắc Hòe, Trần Huy Liệu, Cù Huy Cận, Nguyễn Hữu Đang, the concubine Mộng Điệp, as well as the published documents of the French about the event.

Accordint to the story of French General François Jean Antonin Gonzalez de Linares, he announced that the gold seal and Sword of the State were found on 28 February 1953 at Nghĩa Đô where French soldiers dug for fortifications near the temple. Gonzalez de Linares then noted that he handed them over to the Bảo Đại government on 8 March 1952 as a form of psychological warfare against the Việt Minh as the transfer of these files to the DRV was seen as "Heaven's will". Phạm Cao Phòng questioned why French soldiers were even digging fortifications at that time and at that location and wondered why the French were preparing for Việt Minh tanks in such an unlikely location. Phạm Cao Phong also criticised the lack of an appraisal record to confirm that the Hoàng Đế chi bảo seal was real or fake, as well as Bảo Đại's absence on the day the French returned these objects. Following the return of the ceremonial objects to Bảo Đại the French said "The Nguyễn dynasty goes, the Nguyễn dynasty returns".

Phạm Cao Phong claimed that the more convincing evidence of the Hoàng Đế chi bảo seal not really being the most valuable seal of the Nguyễn dynasty being a psychological blow against the Democratic Republic of Vietnam as Phạm Cao Phong claimed that the most precious seal of the nation was the Đại việt quốc Nguyễn Vĩnh Trấn chi bảo ("Seal of the eternal government of the Nguyễn Lords of the kingdom of Great(er) Viêt") originally created on 6 December 1709 under Nguyễn Phúc Chu, which was named as the most precious family heirloom seal by Emperor Gia Long when he founded the Nguyễn dynasty back in 1802. Phạm Cao Phong noted how the Hoàng Đế chi bảo seal was one the two seals of the Nguyễn that was lost alongside the Trấn thủ tướng quân chi ấn ("Seal of the guardian general") seal, and noted that its most valuable family heirloom seal, the Đại việt quốc Nguyễn Vĩnh Trấn chi bảo seal, was handed over by Emperor Bảo Đại to the government of the DRV outside of the ceremony. He claimed that it would have made more sense if this seal was handed over at the ceremony because of its symbolic significance as no other seal is qualified as legal value as well as the historical age and orthodox documents of the Nguyễn dynasty as the Đại việt quốc Nguyễn Vĩnh Trấn chi bảo seal for the transfer of the throne, especially since Emperor Gia Long said that this seal should "forever be the symbol of the power of the Nguyễn dynasty throne and that his descendants must forever guard it, not lose it, and preserve the memory of the seal and what it stood for, for years and a long time". But noted that the theory that Bảo Đại only gave fake symbols to the Democratic Republic of Vietnam would make less sense as the real Đại việt quốc Nguyễn Vĩnh Trấn chi bảo seal is now in the hands of the Communist government. But that's why according to Phạm Cao Phong the story of the transfer ceremony becomes troublesome. Phạm Cao Phong noted that the Đại việt quốc Nguyễn Vĩnh Trấn chi bảo seal wasn't "a witness" at all at the transfer of power ceremony during the abdication of Bảo Đại which "completely changed the flow of the history of Vietnam 70 years ago". Phạm Cao Phong noted that not a single person directly or indirectly involved in this event reached out to bring this unique witness to the abdication ceremony. He noted that the absence of the Đại việt quốc Nguyễn Vĩnh Trấn chi bảo seal during the abdication ceremony of Bảo Đại may have been an indication of "a dishonest transfer of the throne". Furthermore, he noted that the presence of a rusty sword reinforces that statement.

=== Identity of the seal transferred during the ceremony ===
Most accounts of the events name the Hoàng Đế chi bảo seal as being the seal that Emperor Bảo Đại personally handed over to the representatives of the Provisional Revolutionary Government of the Democratic Republic of Vietnam on 30 August 1945. However, according to the Memoires of Nguyễn Hữu Đang (Hồi ký Nguyễn Hữu Đang) the seal was in fact the Nguyễn lords period Quốc Vương chi ấn ("Seal of the King of the nation") which was created during the reign of Lord Nguyễn Phúc Khoát in 1744. The weight of the seal has also been disputed by various accounts giving vastly different weights of the seal. According to Phạm Khắc Hoè it had a weight of 10 kilograms and was made of pure gold, Trần Huy Liệu claimed that it weighed only 7 kg, while Nguyễn Hữu Đang claimed that the seal weighed around 5 kg. Meanwhile the concubine Mộng Điệp claimed that when she held the seal after it was handed over to her by the French weighed 12.9 kilograms. Furthermore, she described the seal as having a dragon-shaped knob. The dragon on the knob was said to be arched with its head raised and was described as "not very sharp", the dragon is studded with two red pearls.

=== Status of the sword transferred during the ceremony ===
Phạm Cao Phong noted that the Nguyễn dynasty (and earlier Nguyễn lords) were known for being especially cruel during their reigns, such as Nguyễn Văn Thành, a Tây Sơn Rebellion war hero that was responsible for severe victories for the Nguyễn dynasty being executed for two lines in a poem by his son in 1815, Gia Long had the son executed. Phan Châu Trinh records that the emperor had also had Thành himself and Thành's elderly father executed. In effect this was the case, as Thành was driven to take his own life. Furthermore, Phạm Cao Phong stated that he believed that it was unlikely for servants to let the "butcher's sword" (Gươm đồ tể), a reference to cruelty of the Nguyễn dynasty, rust as it was a worship object in the imperial palace and servants were recruited to protect all objects in the imperial palace from even dust. Phạm Cao Phong wondered why a sword in the possession of the Nguyễn dynasty with such high symbolic value would even be subject to the level of negligence that would let it be subject to oxidation.

Phạm Khắc Hoè, who did the inventorisation of the family heirlooms of the Nguyễn dynasty wrote in January 1945 regarding the status of all ceremonial items in the palace:

English translation: "Every year on the 20th day of the 12th month of the lunar calendar, the court conducted the Phất Thức ceremony. Part of the duty is to open the cellar to take all the objects out to check them and then sweep them clean from dust, clean them thoroughly and then store them in the locked vault again. By doing these things, mandarins from the secondary school upwards may attend the ceremony and have to do everything by themselves, bring the objects out, put them back in, and clean them up. During the Feast of the Chạp month of the Giáp Thân year (January 1945), I have closely watched the review of these objects and the inventories are reworked in Chữ Quốc ngữ rather than in Chinese characters as before."

— Bảo Đại trao kiếm giả cho 'cách mạng'? (Did Bảo Đại give a fake sword to the "revolution"?) by Phạm Cao Phong (BBC).

As a second point in his article Phạm Cao Phong noted that the art of creating swords during the Nguyễn dynasty period had reached its zenith and Vietnamese swords during this period were of the highest quality, as an example he cited the fact that on 5 July 1885 the French seized a sword once owned by Emperor Gia Long which is now on display at the Hôtel des Invalides in Paris still looks new despite its age. So Phạm Cao Phong wondered how such a relatively new sword in the hands of such a cruel dynasty that took good care of its possessions would be in such a bad state. He concluded that the sword Bảo Đại handed over to the Democratic Republic of Vietnam must have been a fake sword.

In his memoires, Cù Huy Cận wrote that after receiving the Sword of the State he admired the gilded exterior of the sword but was curious to the blade itself which appeared to have suffered from oxidation, this made him comment on the rusty state of the sword in a microphone which made the crowd laugh and got a chuckle out of Emperor Bảo Đại.

Phạm Cao Phong noted that it is possible that Phạm Khắc Hòe quickly commissioned the creation of a fake sword after meeting Trần Huy Liệu on 28 August 1945 and being unimpressed with the government of the Democratic Republic of Vietnam.

In the Memoires of Nguyễn Hữu Đang (Hồi ký Nguyễn Hữu Đang), Nguyễn Hữu Đang described the blade as being gold. Of its three sheaths, the widest was two inches thick and it contains sharp claws like rice leaves. The sheaths are carved meticulously describing the hand of the craftsman as the quintessence of fine art work. Nguyễn Hữu Đang described the blade as coming from fairy tale.

According to the contradictory reports, the rusty sword in Cù Huy Cận's hand on 30 August 1945 turned into a golden sword in Nguyễn Hữu Đang's hands within a period of only three days. Trần Huy Liệu stated that he had submitted the sword, alongside the seal, to Hồ Chí Minh and the Standing Central Committee of the Democratic Republic of Vietnam. Phạm Cao Phong believes that there is a possibility that the government of the Democratic Republic of Vietnam found out that this sword was a fake and got another sword instead, as he stated that "Rusty gold is fake gold" (Vàng gỉ là vàng giả).

=== Misreporting on the transfer ceremony by the Vietnam Military History Museum ===
In 2020 the Vietnam Military History Museum, Hanoi opened the exhibition "The August Revolution - Historical Milestone" (Cách mạng tháng Tám - Mốc son lịch sử) with more than 300 documents, images and artifacts about the August Revolution leading to the establishment of the Democratic Republic of Vietnam. Several photographs at the exhibition depicted soldiers in French-style uniforms holding the ceremonial items of the abdication, these photographs have descriptions that allude to them being of the abdication ceremony, but Cù Huy Hà Vũ in his Voice of America article Kỳ án ấn và kiếm tại lễ thoái vị của vua Bảo Đại - Kỳ 1 (The seal and sword at the abdication ceremony of Sovereign Bảo Đại - Part 1) noted that these soldiers couldn't have been Nguyễn dynasty soldiers as their uniforms didn't match the Nguyễn dynasty military uniforms of the Bảo Đại period. Furthermore, he noted that the background clearly shows the Ba Đình Square in Hanoi as opposed to Huế where the abdication ceremony took place. He concluded that these photographs were indeed from a French colonial ceremony held in 1952 symbolising the return of Emperor Bảo Đại rather than his abdication.

== Sources ==
- Bảo Đại, Con Rồng Việt Nam [Bảo Đại, Dragon of Vietnam] (in Vietnamese). Nguyễn Phước Tộc Xuất Bản. 1990. Translated from Le dragon d'Annam, Bao Dai, Plon, 1980. (in French).
- Grandclément, Daniel (1997). Bao Daï ou les derniers jours de l'empire d'Annam (in French). JC Lattès.
- Nghiêm Kế Tổ - Vietnam: Blood & Fire (Việt Nam Máu Lửa). Publisher: Mai Lĩnh Publishing House. Published : 1954. (in Vietnamese).
- Shiraishi, Masaya (2018). "The Fall of a Royal Throne: The August Revolution in Vietnam and the Last Emperor". In Shiraishi, Masaya; Lockhart, Bruce M. (eds.). Essays on Vietnam and Thailand during the Second World War. Waseda University Institute of Asia-Pacific Studies.
