= Bảo Long =

Vietnamese prince (1936–2007)

Nguyễn Phúc Bảo Long
- Crown Prince of Vietnam
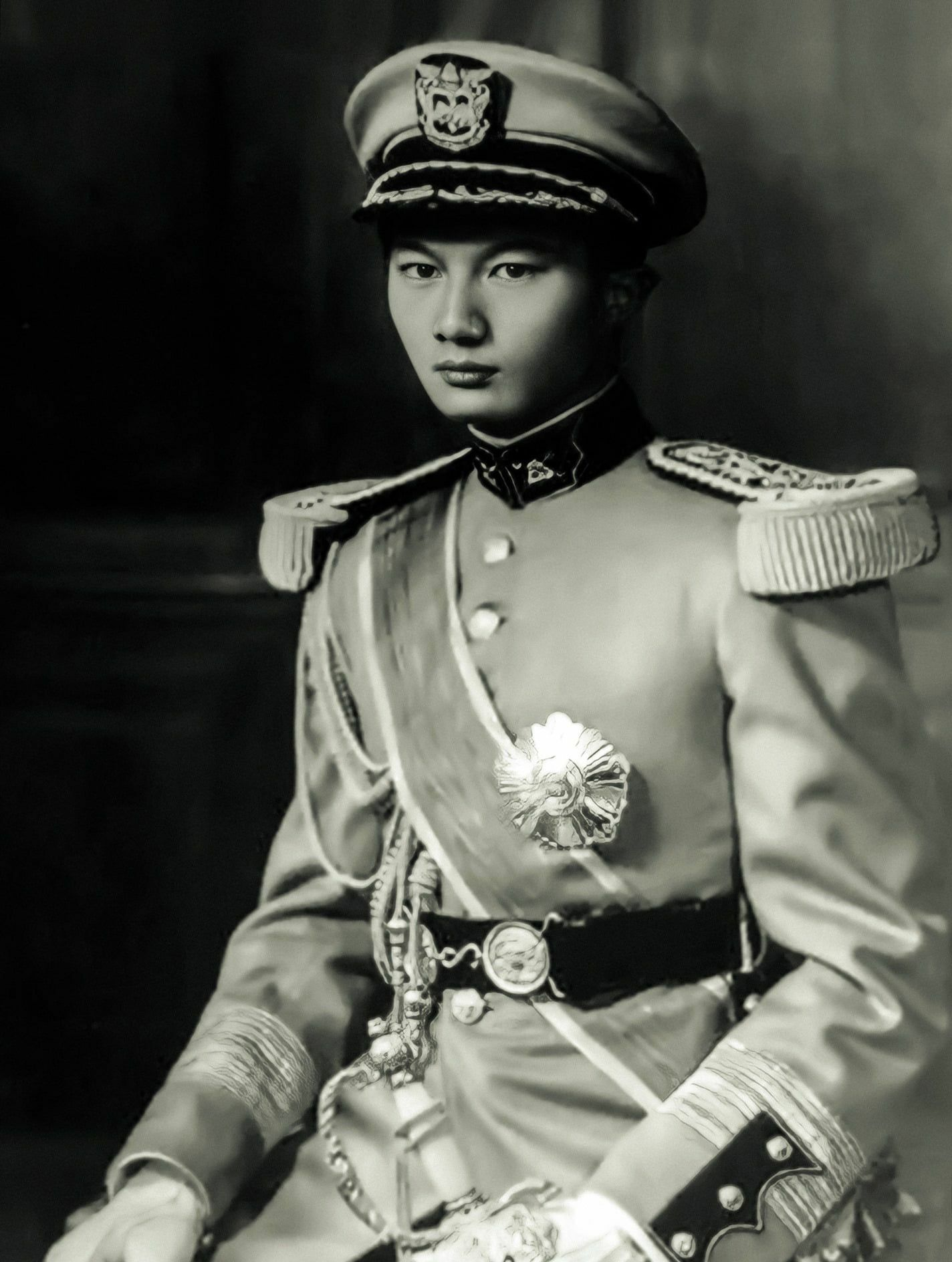

Head of the House of Nguyen Phuc
- Pretence: 30 July 1997 – 28 July 2007
- Predecessor: Bảo Đại
- Successor: Bảo Thăng
- Born: 4 January 1936; Kien Trung Palace, Huế, French Indochina
- Died: 28 July 2007 (aged 71); Sens, France
- Burial: Chabrignac, Corrèze, France
- Spouse: Thérèse Marie Delanne
- Dynasty: Nguyễn Phúc
- Father: Bảo Đại
- Mother: Nam Phương

In the Vietnamese name below, Nguyễn is the surname.

Bảo Long

Vietnamese name
- Vietnamese: Nguyễn Phúc Bảo Long
- Hán-Nôm: 阮福保隆

Nguyễn Phúc Bảo Long, Crown Prince of Vietnam (阮福保隆, 4 January 1936 – 28 July 2007) was the eldest son of Emperor Bảo Đại and Empress Nam Phương. He was the last crown prince of the Nguyễn dynasty. He had one younger brother, Bảo Thăng, and three younger sisters, Phuong Mai, Phuong Lien and Phuong Dung, all of whom live in France.

== Biography ==
Bảo Long was born at Kien-Trung Palace, Huế on 4 January 1936, to Emperor Bảo Đại and his first wife, Empress Nam Phương. On 7 March 1939, he was invested and proclaimed Crown Prince, the official heir to the throne, in a Confucian ceremony at Can-Chanh Palace in Huế.

In 1947, Empress Nam Phuong left Vietnam with the crown prince and his siblings. They lived at the Château Thorenc outside Cannes, France, and he grew up as a member of the Catholic Church.

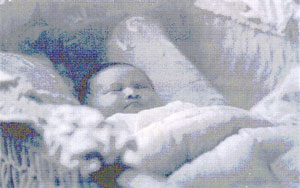
Infant Bảo Long (1936)

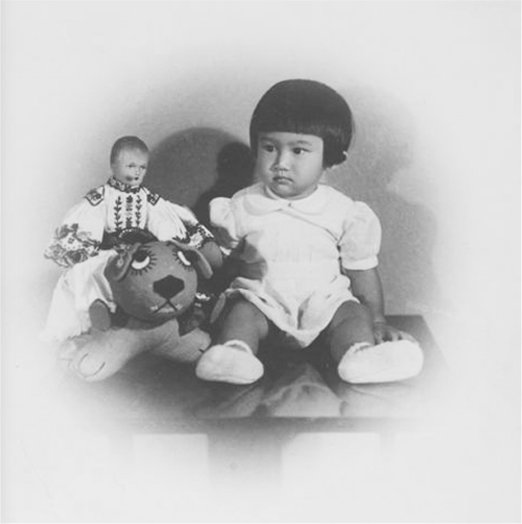
Little prince

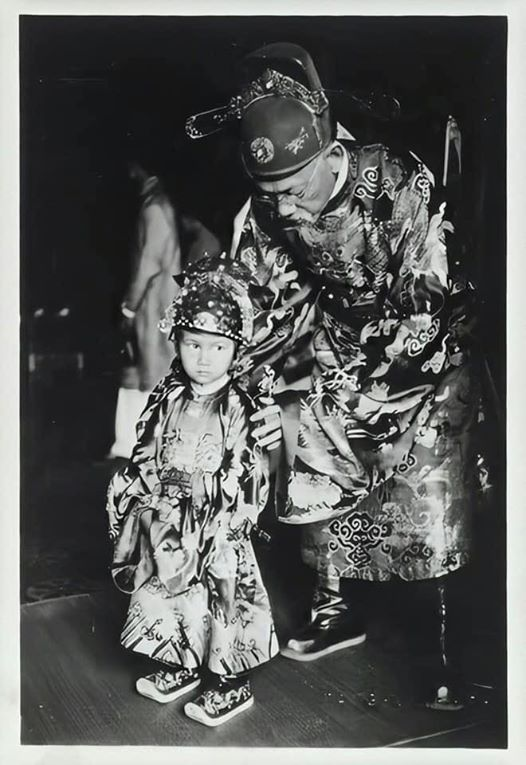
Young crown prince at Crown Prince's Investiture Ceremony (1939)

=== Education ===
He received his education at the École des Roches boarding school at Maslacq, then at Clères, Normandy. He then went to Paris and studied law and political science to prepare him to serve on state affairs.

In 1953, Crown Prince Bảo Long attended the coronation of Elizabeth II in London, as a representative of the Vietnamese Imperial Family.

=== Military service ===
Crown Prince Bảo Long served in the French Foreign Legion in the Algerian War and he highly distinguished himself, earning the Croix de Guerre (Cross of Military Valor) with three stars for his courage in battle. His other decorations are the Grand Cross of the National Order of Merit, the decoration of the Golden Gong 2nd Class, the Grand Cross of the Royal Order of Cambodia, the Order of the Million Elephants and the White Parasol of Laos and the Queen Elizabeth II Coronation Medal. After 10 years of service in the French Foreign Legion, he returned to Paris, France, where he worked in a bank. He spent the remainder of his life as an investment banker.

=== Head of the Imperial House ===
In 1997, when the Emperor Bảo Đại died, Bảo Long inherited the position of head of the House of Nguyễn Phúc. He remained out of politics and lived quietly in Paris.

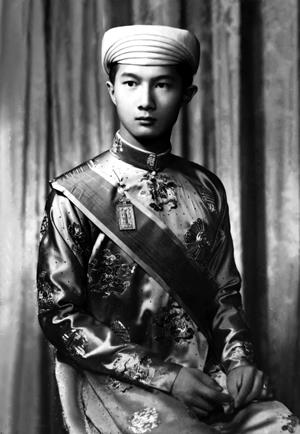
Crown prince Bảo Long

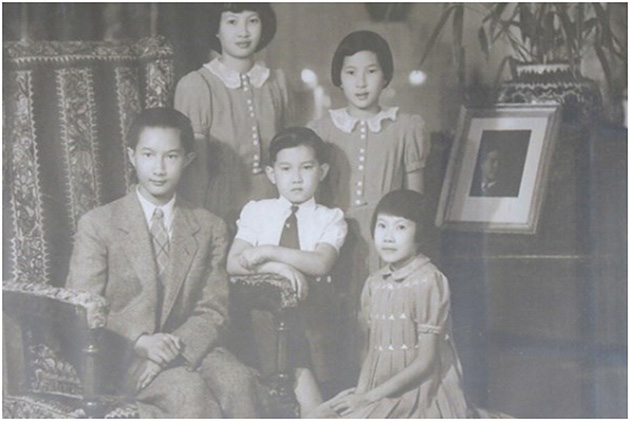
Crown prince Bảo Long (left) and younger siblings

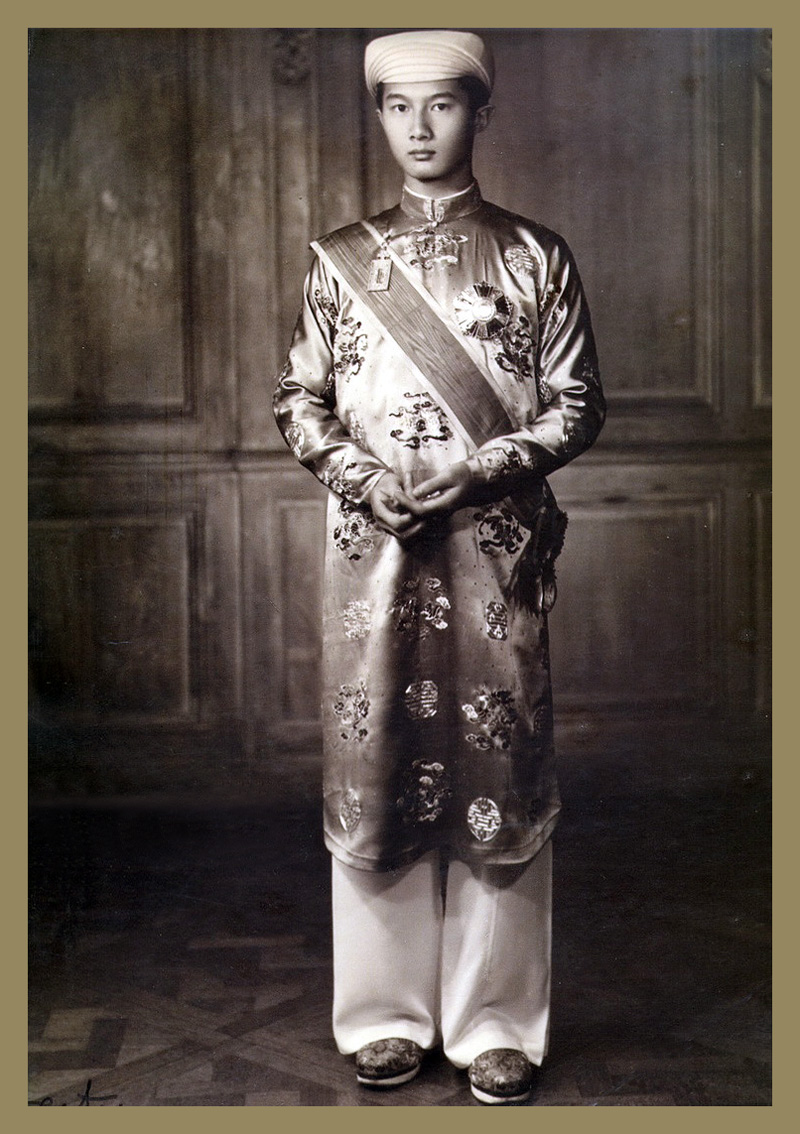
Crown prince Bảo Long in traditional Ao Dai

Following the death of Bảo Đại, Bảo Long allegedly sold the sword that was handed over in the 1945 abdication ceremony.

During his time as head of the house, Bảo Long worked with Prince Bảo Vàng, who was appointed Grandmaster of the Imperial Order of the Dragon of Annam in 2005. The focus of the order is on humanitarian, educational, and cultural endeavours of the people of Vietnam.

Although the Vietnamese Constitutional Monarchist League wish to restore the Nguyễn dynasty to the throne under a constitutional monarchy, as in Cambodia and Thailand, Bảo Long did not support their political aspirations.

Crown Prince Bao Long died at the Le Centre Hospitalier Gaston Ramon, Sens, Burgundy on 28 July 2007, with his brother, Bảo Thăng, succeeding him as head of the house.

== Personal life ==
From the late 1960s until the early 1970s, Bảo Long was the companion of Isabelle Hebey (died 1996), an interior designer, who worked on his Paris residence. Though they planned to wed in June 1969, after Hebey's divorce from architect Marc Delanne, the marriage did not take place.

== Honours ==
=== National ===
- Sovereign and Grand Master of the Imperial Order of the Dragon of Annam.
- The Boi Decoration, 1st class.
- Knight Grand Cross of the National Order of Merit of Vietnam (15 June 1954).

=== Foreign ===
- Knight Grand Cross of the Order of the Million Elephants and the White Parasol (Kingdom of Laos).
- Knight Grand Cross of the Royal Order of Cambodia (Kingdom of Cambodia).
- Knight Grand Cross of the National Order of Merit (French Republic).
- Cross for Military Valour with red, silver and bronze stars (French Republic, 1958).
- Croix de guerre (French Republic).
- North Africa Medal (French Republic, 1997).
- Queen Elizabeth II Coronation Medal (United Kingdom, 2 June 1953).

Bảo Long House of Nguyễn Phúc Born: 4 January 1936 Died: 28 July 2007
Preceded by Emperor Bảo Đại	Head of the House of Nguyen Phuc; 30 July 1997 – 28 July 2007	Succeeded by Prince Bảo Thăng
