= Côn Đảo =

Special administrative region in Southeast Vietnam

Côn Đảo Đặc khu Côn Đảo Côn Sơn
- Special administrative region
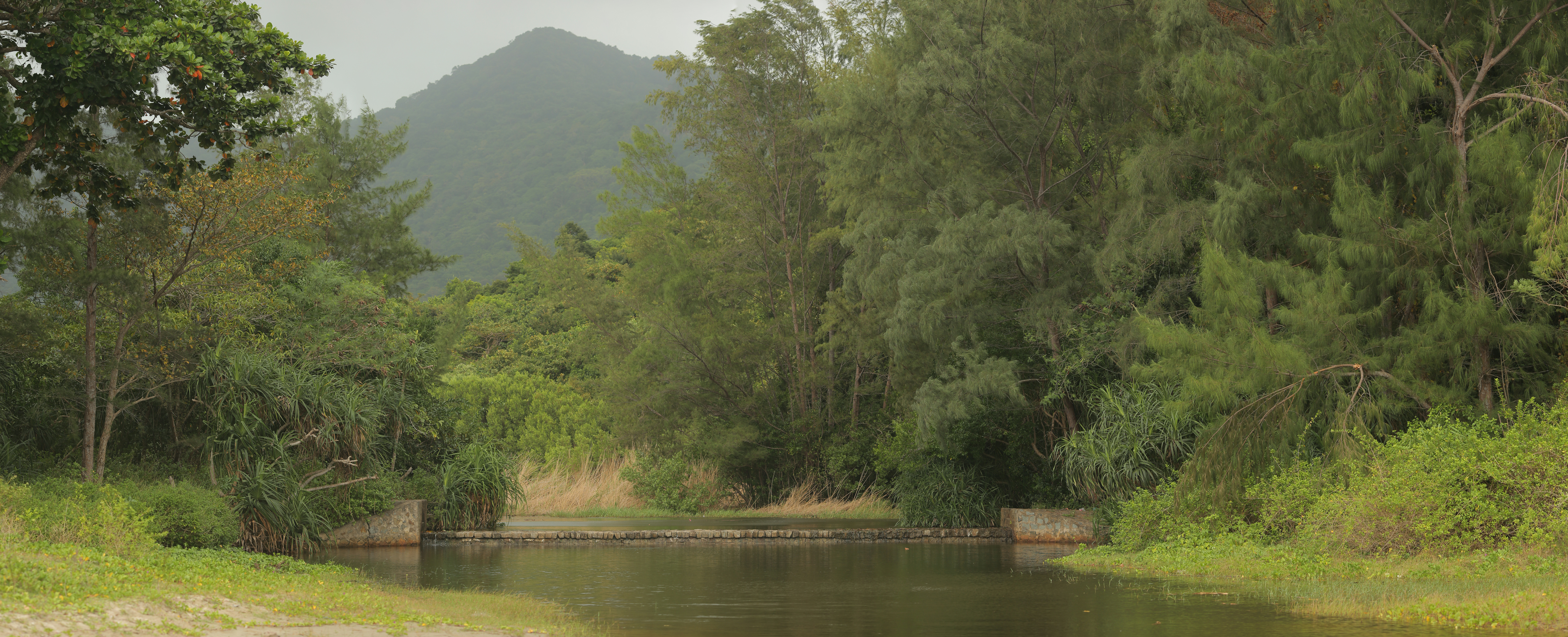
- Côn Đảo National Park

- Location within Vietnam
- Coordinates: 8°41′35″N 106°34′36″E
- Country: Vietnam
- Region: Southeast
- City: Ho Chi Minh City
- Capital: Côn Sơn

Area
  - Total: 76 km^{2} (29 sq mi)

Population (2019 census)
  - Total: 8,827
  - Density: 120/km^{2} (300/sq mi)
- Time zone: UTC+7 (Indochina Time)

Côn Đảo (lit. 'Côn Island'), officially the Côn Đảo Special Zone (Vietnamese: Đặc khu Côn Đảo) is an archipelago in the East Sea (South China Sea), and Ho Chi Minh City's only special zone.

== Geography ==
Situated about 185 km (115 mi) from Vũng Tàu and 230 km (140 mi) from Ho Chi Minh City, the group includes 16 mountainous islands and islets. The total land area reaches 75.15 km^{2} (29.02 sq mi) and the local population is about 5,000.

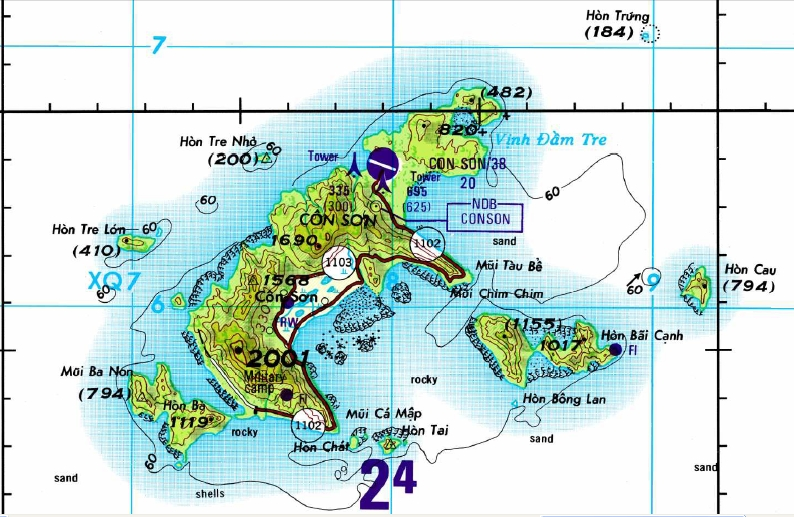
Map of Côn Đảo

The islands are composed of magmatic rocks of different ages. Hòn Bảy Cạnh, Hòn Cau and Hòn Bông Lang are composed of Cretaceous microgranite rocks. The northern part of Côn Đảo Island is composed of quartz diorite and granite - granodiorite of the late Mesozoic- early Cenozoic ages and is partially covered by Quaternary marine sediments. The southern part of this island and Hòn Bà island are composed of the rhyolite and intrusive formations of unknown age. On the western slope of Côn Đảo Island, there exist groups of outcrops of diorite and microgranite penetrated by big quartz bands.

The island group is served by Con Dao Airport (IATA: VCS, ICAO: VVCS) situated on the largest island in the archipelago, Côn Sơn Island. The total size of Côn Đảo Airport is 3,792 m^{2} (40,820 sq ft), with one runway 1,830 m (6,000 ft) long. It can handle 400,000 passengers per year. Currently, Vietnam Airlines (Operated by VASCO), Bamboo Airways and Vietnam Helicopters are three airlines operating flights to the island.

== History ==
In c. 767, the Java (Daba) fleets from the Shailendra dynasty attacked the islands. The Cambodian inscriptions generally say the fleets were Malayan, Sumatran, Javanese, or all of them, and they quickly seized the island of Pulo-Condor (Côn Sơn Island). At that time, the islands were used by Javanese pirates to conduct numerous military raids on Champa and Chiaou-Chou.

On June 16, 1702, the East India Company from England founded a settlement on Côn Sơn Island, which they named Pulo Condore as an entrepôt for ships plying between India and China. Three years later, on 2 March 1705, the Bugis mercenaries hired by the English mutinied, murdering the agents, destroying the factory, and expelling the remaining settlers.

During the internecine wars for the Court of Huế, the Nguyễn prince, Gia Long, born Nguyễn Phúc Ánh, ceded the islands to France as part of the 1787 Treaty of Versailles in return for military assistance. The treaty however was abrogated as France failed to provide the aid.

It was only under conquest that the islands came under French control in 1861. Côn Sơn Island became infamous during the French colonial era because of Côn Đảo Prison and the notorious "tiger cages". Vietnamese and Cambodian nationalists and revolutionaries were sent here to serve their sentences for anti-French activities. Many Vietnamese Communist leaders were "schooled" on Côn Đảo Island as well.

The French Indochinese government named the group of islands Poulo-Condore Islands, a name that derives from the islands' Malay name Pulo Condore (pulau meaning "island" and kundur meaning "wax gourd"). The islands can be identified with Ptolemy's Satyrorum insulae (Isles of the Satyrs), a name probably drawn from the monkeys endemic to the islands, the Con Song long-tailed macaque, (Macaca fascicularis ssp. condorensis). Ptolemy refers to the three islands inhabited by people, 'said to have tails such as they depict satyrs having'.

In 2020, the United States Navy sent ships on freedom of navigation exercises around the islands to challenge what they deemed to be Vietnam's "excessive maritime claims."

== Climate ==
Climate data for Côn Đảo
Month	Jan	Feb	Mar	Apr	May	Jun	Jul	Aug	Sep	Oct	Nov	Dec	Year
Record high °C (°F)	31.6 (88.9)	33.0 (91.4)	33.1 (91.6)	35.1 (95.2)	35.5 (95.9)	34.5 (94.1)	34.0 (93.2)	33.5 (92.3)	33.8 (92.8)	33.8 (92.8)	32.0 (89.6)	32.2 (90.0)	35.5 (95.9)
Mean daily maximum °C (°F)	27.9 (82.2)	28.6 (83.5)	30.1 (86.2)	31.6 (88.9)	31.9 (89.4)	31.0 (87.8)	30.7 (87.3)	30.5 (86.9)	30.4 (86.7)	30.1 (86.2)	29.4 (84.9)	28.2 (82.8)	30.0 (86.0)
Daily mean °C (°F)	25.3 (77.5)	25.7 (78.3)	26.8 (80.2)	28.1 (82.6)	28.4 (83.1)	28.0 (82.4)	27.8 (82.0)	27.7 (81.9)	27.4 (81.3)	27.1 (80.8)	26.9 (80.4)	26.0 (78.8)	27.1 (80.8)
Mean daily minimum °C (°F)	24.1 (75.4)	24.1 (75.4)	24.7 (76.5)	25.5 (77.9)	25.6 (78.1)	25.4 (77.7)	25.2 (77.4)	25.3 (77.5)	25.0 (77.0)	24.9 (76.8)	25.3 (77.5)	24.7 (76.5)	25.0 (77.0)
Record low °C (°F)	17.9 (64.2)	17.7 (63.9)	19.0 (66.2)	19.2 (66.6)	21.3 (70.3)	20.7 (69.3)	20.6 (69.1)	19.9 (67.8)	21.4 (70.5)	21.1 (70.0)	19.0 (66.2)	19.7 (67.5)	17.7 (63.9)
Average precipitation mm (inches)	12.5 (0.49)	12.8 (0.50)	11.2 (0.44)	38.6 (1.52)	209.6 (8.25)	288.9 (11.37)	296.7 (11.68)	297.5 (11.71)	316.4 (12.46)	350.6 (13.80)	174.9 (6.89)	52.9 (2.08)	2,070 (81.50)
Average rainy days	2.2	0.7	1.7	4.8	14.9	18.6	18.8	19.6	19.7	19.6	12.3	5.5	138.4
Average relative humidity (%)	77.7	79.5	79.7	79.4	80.6	81.6	80.8	80.5	82.5	84.2	81.9	79.2	80.7
Mean monthly sunshine hours	206.4	221.7	264.2	267.5	222.5	171.9	182.3	182.6	159.3	162.0	161.2	161.6	2,343.5
Source 1: Vietnam Institute for Building Science and Technology
Source 2: The Yearbook of Indochina

== Côn Đảo National Park ==
Many of the islands were given protected status in 1984 as part of Côn Đảo National Park. This natural preserve was subsequently enlarged in 1998. Endangered species protected within the park include the hawksbill sea turtle, the green sea turtle, dolphins, and the dugong. Ecosystems represented in the park include seagrass meadow, mangrove and coral reefs.

Côn Đảo National Park is working with the World Wide Fund for Nature, formerly the World Wildlife Fund, (WWF) Vietnam to further protection in the marine areas, with programs to establish a marine protected area that protects coral reefs, seagrass beds and species, while also developing sustainable nature-based ecotourism. The island's management is strongly geared towards sustainable use, hoping to learn from previous experiences in Vietnam and the region to balance development with conservation.

== Ferry ==
A hydrofoil service from Vũng Tàu to Côn Đảo was started in February 2019. The service is a daily return and boasts that the ferry will operate year-round, regardless of the weather. Travel time is 4–5 hours.

Two ferries operate between Côn Đảo and the mainland. There is a daily overnight hour ferry service from Vũng Tàu which, in addition to bringing passengers, serves as the main source of importing goods to the islands. The ferry operates on a daily basis, however in winter months the service depends largely on weather conditions as the seas between Côn Đảo and the mainland can be rough.

In 2016, a ferry service primarily for passengers opened up between Sóc Trăng and Côn Đảo, shortening the length of the journey to three hours. With the addition of a fast ferry to the islands, the islands have experienced an increase in tourism fueled mostly by domestic tourists who view Côn Đảo as a sacred place due to its history.

=== List of islands ===
Côn Đảo Islands include 16 islands, with a total area of 76 km^{2} (29 sq mi)

- Côn Lôn Island or Côn Sơn Island (French: Grande-Condore), Phú Hải, 51.52 km^{2} (19.89 sq mi)
- Little Côn Lôn Island (Petite-Condore), or Hòn Bà, Phú Sơn, 5.45 km^{2} (2.10 sq mi)
- Bảy Cạnh Island, or Bãi Cạnh Island, Phú Hòa, 5.5 km^{2} (2.1 sq mi)
- Cau Island, or Phú Lệ 1.8 km^{2} (0.69 sq mi)
- Bông Lan Island, or Bông Lang, Bông Lau, Phú Phong, 0.2 km^{2} (0.077 sq mi)
- Vung Island, or Phú Vinh, 0.15 km^{2} (0.058 sq mi)
- Ngọc Island, or Trọc Island, hòn Trai, Phú Nghĩa, 0.4 km^{2} (0.15 sq mi)
- Trứng Island, or Đá Bạc Island, Đá Trắng Island, Phú Thọ, 0.1 km^{2} (0.039 sq mi)
- Tài Lớn Island, or Phú Bình 0.38 km^{2} (0.15 sq mi)
- Tài Nhỏ Island, or Thỏ Island, Phú An, 0.1 km^{2} (0.039 sq mi)
- Trác Lớn Island, or Phú Hưng 0.25 km^{2} (0.097 sq mi)
- Trác Nhỏ Island, or Phú Thịnh 0.1 km^{2} (0.039 sq mi)
- Tre Lớn Island, or Phú Hòa 0.75 km^{2} (0.29 sq mi)
- Tre Nhỏ Island, or Phú Hội, 0.25 km^{2} (0.097 sq mi)
- Anh Island, or Trứng Lớn Island
- Em Island, or Trứng Nhỏ Island

== Thứ phi Hoàng Phi Yến ==
Thứ phi Hoàng Phi Yến, or Imperial Concubine Phi Yến, is a controversial local legend from the Côn Đảo archipelago. According to the legend she was the concubine of Lord Gia Long (Nguyễn Phúc Ánh) and gave birth to a son known as Prince Cải, she advised Lord Ánh not to ask foreigners for help as that would make their victory less glorious and might cause issues in future, these comments caused Lord Ánh to be suspicious of her motives and to lock her up in a cave. Later when their toddler asked where his mother was he killed him. She grieved their son and later committed suicide as she was touched by a butcher during a vegetarian festival seeing it as "harming her honour as a concubine". This caused the villagers of Côn Đảo to hold a festival in her honour every year.

By the mid-19th century her story had mingled with older sea-mother traditions on Côn Lôn, transforming her gradually from a wronged concubine into a kind of protective island guardian: a figure who warns sailors of approaching storms, appears in dreams to lost children, and accepts offerings of rice cakes and paper lanterns.

By the early 20th century the annual festival in her honour had become a syncretic affair, drawing together courtly rites imagined from Nguyễn dynastic memory, folk spirit-mediumship, and the austere etiquette of the island’s fishing clans. Children dressed as little mandarins reenacted Prince Cải’s doomed innocence; elders recited improvised verses cautioning leaders against arrogance and foreign entanglements; women released small boats made of banana bark into the tide, sending prayers for safe seas and steadfast hearts.
