= Bảo Thăng =

Nguyễn Phúc Bảo Thăng
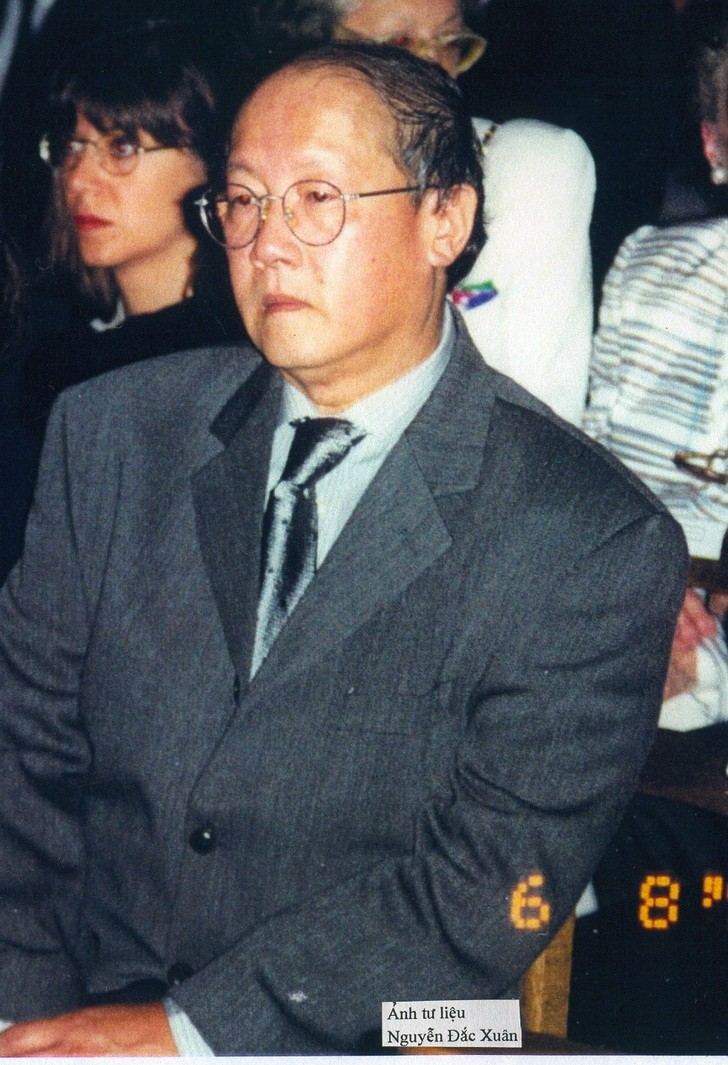

Head of the House of Nguyen Phuc
- Pretence: 28 July 2007 – 15 March 2017
- Predecessor: Bảo Long
- Successor: Bảo Ngọc
- Born: 30 September 1944; Đà Lạt, Annam, French Indochina
- Died: 15 March 2017 (aged 72); Paris, France
- Dynasty: Nguyễn Phúc
- Father: Bảo Đại
- Mother: Nam Phương

Prince Nguyễn Phúc Bảo Thăng (30 September 1944 – 15 March 2017) was the son of Emperor Bảo Đại and Empress Nam Phương of Vietnam. He became head of the House of Nguyễn Phúc following the death of his brother, Bảo Long, on 28 July 2007.

== Education ==
He attended the schools of Couvent des Oiseaux in Neuilly-sur-Seine, France, and Collège d'Adran, in Đà Lạt. Bảo Thăng lived in exile in France.

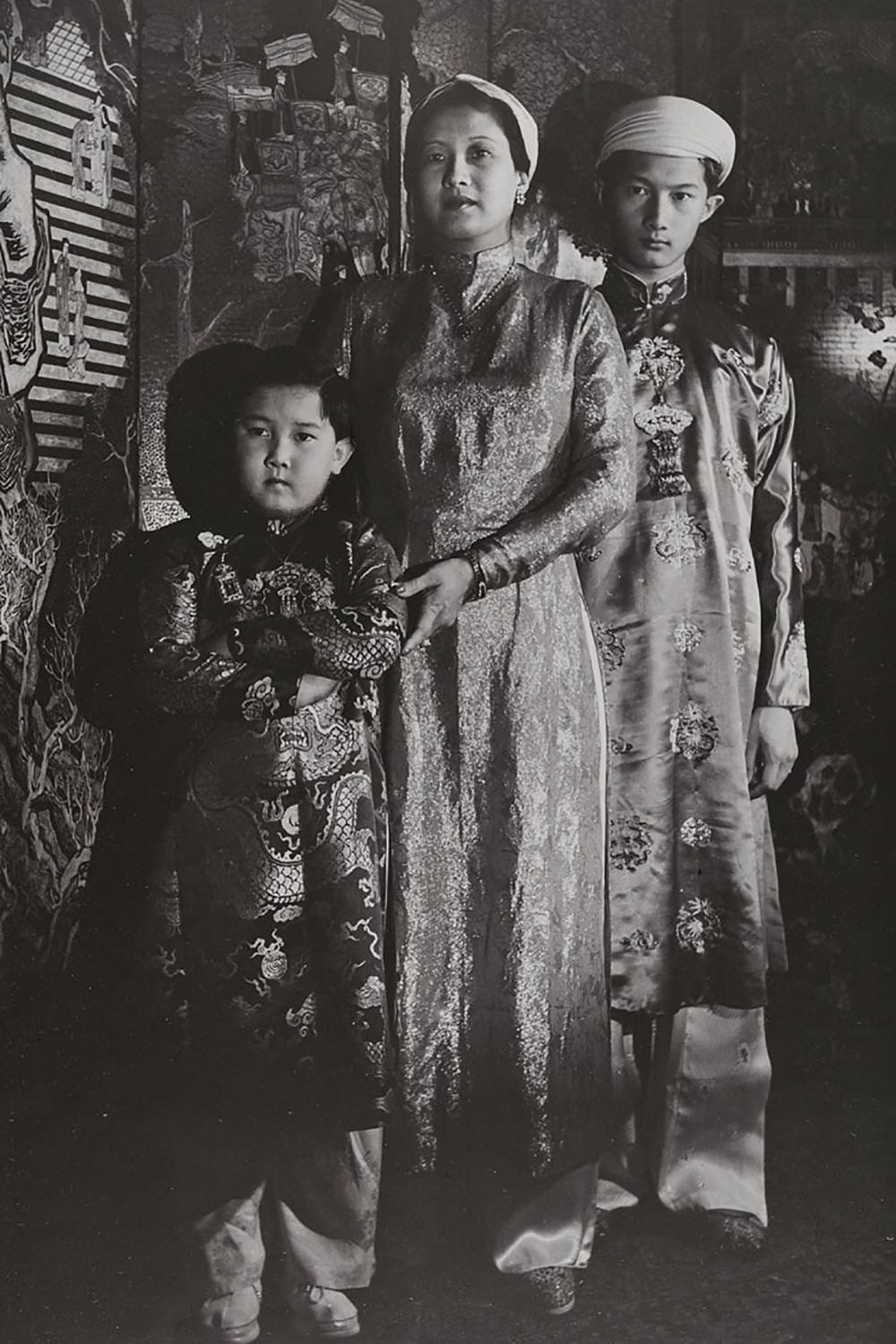
Bảo Thăng (left) and Bảo Long (right) with their mother

== Honours ==
- Knight Grand Collar of the Order of the Eagle of Georgia (Royal House of Georgia).

== Ancestry ==
Ancestors of Bảo Thăng

8. Đồng Khánh
4. Khải Định
9. Nguyễn Khắc Niêm
2. Bảo Đại
10. Hoàng Văn Tích, Duke of Nghi
5. Hoàng Thị Cúc
1. Bảo Thăng
6. Pierre Nguyễn Hữu-Hào, Duke of Long Mỹ
3. Marie Thérèse Nguyễn Hữu Thị Lan
14. Philippe Le Phat Dat
7. Marie Lê Thị Binh

Bảo Thăng House of Nguyễn Phúc Born: 30 September 1944 Died: 15 March 2017
Preceded by Crown Prince Bảo Long	Head of the House of Nguyen Phuc; 28 July 2007 – 15 March 2017	Succeeded by Guy Georges Vĩnh San
