= Guy Georges Vĩnh San =

- Head of the House of Nguyễn Phúc
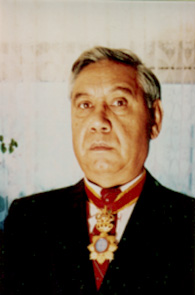
- Georges in 1993

Head of the House of Nguyễn Phúc
- Pretence: 15 March 2017 – present
- Predecessor: Bảo Thăng
- Born: January 31, 1933 (age 93); Saint-Denis, Réunion
- Spouse: Monique
- Issue: Son: Patrick; Daughters: Chantal, Annick, Pascale
- House: House of Nguyễn Phúc
- Dynasty: Nguyễn dynasty
- Father: Emperor Duy Tân
- Mother: Fernande Antier

Guy Georges Vĩnh San (born 31 January 1933 in Saint-Denis, Réunion), also Prince Nguyễn Phúc Bảo Ngọc, is a son of Vietnamese emperor Duy Tân who reigned from 1907 to 1916. Since 2017, he has been the head of the House of Nguyễn Phúc, Vietnam's former imperial house. Georges lives in France.

== Biography ==
Duy Tân was deposed by the French administration after he attempted an uprising in 1916. He was exiled to the island of Réunion in the Indian Ocean. There he met and married Fernande Antier. Georges was their first child.

During World War II, Duy Tân sided with Charles de Gaulle against the pro-German French government of Philippe Pétain.

"In 1940 my father read de Gaulle's summons to the resistance," Georges recalled. "Then he called all his friends and said: 'I do not know de Gaulle, but I should follow him, because he is on the right track.' My father was very close to France, but not the France of Pétain."

Duy Tân served with De Gaulle's Free French and died in a plane crash in 1945, cutting short a planned return to Vietnamese politics.

Duy Tân was more popular than Emperor Bảo Đại and ranked higher in the genealogy of the Nguyễn Phúc clan. Bảo Đại's pro-Vichy government attempted to head off a claim to the throne by Georges by treating him as illegitimate. In 1946, a French court sided with Georges and declared him to be a legitimate son of Duy Tân.

In 1987, Georges traveled to Huế, the former imperial capital, for the reburial of his father. In 2016, he went to Huế to attend a family death anniversary.

Georges was educated at Lycée Leconte-de-Lisle in Réunion and at Lycée Chasseloup-Laubat in Saigon. He served in the French Army from 1956 to 1967. He worked for the Directorate General of Customs and Excise at Orly Airport in 1969–1981 and later at St Denis de Réunion (1991–1996).

Georges married Monique at Fort de France, Martinique, May 1954. He has one son, Patrick, and three daughters, Chantal, Annick, and Pascale.
