= Phùng Khắc Khoan =

Vietnamese military strategist, politician, diplomat and poet

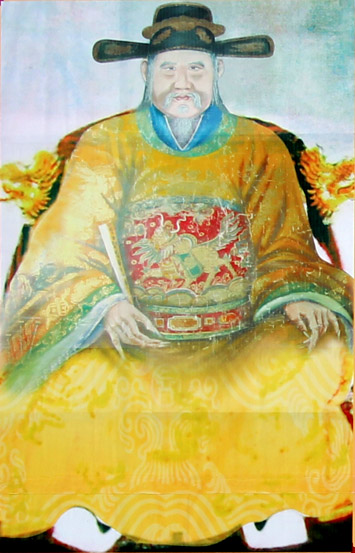
- Portrait of Phùng Khắc Khoan
- Vietnamese alphabet: Phùng Khắc Khoan
- Chữ Hán: 馮克寬

Phùng Khắc Khoan (1528–1613), courtesy name Hoằng Phu, pen name Nghị Trai, Mai Nham Tử, known as Trạng Bùng, was a noted 16th-century Vietnamese military strategist, politician, diplomat and poet during the Later Lê dynasty warlord period.

Phùng Khắc Khoan headed the diplomatic corps to China during the Ming, during which he took part in a notable summit colloquy, conducted in writing, with the Korean historian Yi Su-gwang in 1597.

== Sources ==
- Phan Huy Chú, tiểu truyện "Phùng Khắc Khoan" trong Lịch triều hiến chương loại chí (bản dịch, tập 1). Nhà xuất bản Khoa học xã hội, 1992.
- Bùi Duy Tân, mục từ: "Phùng Khắc khoan" tronng Từ điển văn học (bộ mới). Nhà xuất bản Thế giới, 2004.
- Trịnh Vân Thanh, Thành ngữ-điển tích-danh nhân từ điển (quyển 2). Nhà xuất bản Hồn Thiêng, Sài Gòn, 1966.
- Trần Văn Giáp, Tìm hiểu kho sách Hán Nôm (trọn bộ). Nhà xuất bản Khoa học xã hội, 2003.
- Trần Thị Băng Thanh (chủ biên), Văn học thế kỷ XV-XVII. Nhà xuất bản Khoa học xã hội, 2004.
