= Tsuita =

Japanese social networking app

- Release: December 10, 2024
- Available in: Japanese (Pseudo-Chinese)
- Type: Social networking service

Tsuita (対多, Tsuita) is a freeware app for social networking, made and operated by an independent developer. The application, intended as a joke, forbids users from posting any script other than kanji. As real Japanese writing uses a mixture of kanji – Chinese logograms adapted for written Japanese – and the native Japanese syllabic scripts of hiragana and katakana, this forces users to communicate in pseudo-Chinese.

== History ==
The application was launched on 10 December 2024 as a joke application, initially planned to shut down one month later. The application experienced heavy traffic after its release which resulted in a massive increase in server costs, forcing the developer to temporarily suspend all services on 14 December, lasting until 18 December. The application later came first in App Store for the number of free application downloads.

== Features ==
Tsuita forces all users to use Kanji scripts only, which forces all users to speak in Pseudo-Chinese. Due to this restriction, images cannot be uploaded and links cannot be posted. The application works on iOS via Apple Store or Android via Google Store. The application allows users to anonymously start a discussion thread, and comment, and react on it. After the temporary suspension of services until 18 December, users were given an option to watch an advertisement for monetization from the settings tab. The application is only available in Japan due to its limitations.

== Reception ==
The community of Tsuita has been described as kinder and less toxic than many others. Some have claimed this is due to its limitations making it difficult to insult someone, as users are restricted to kanji scripts. Yahoo News positively rated the application and the time people have to spend thinking of a way to convey messages with only kanji.

== See also ==
- Emojli – app where users could only use emoji
