= Thánh Tông di thảo =

Short story collection

Thánh Tông di thảo (chữ Hán: 聖宗遺草; lit. 'Thánh Tông's Posthumous Manuscript') is a Vietnamese short story collection written in Literary Chinese, attributed to Lê Thánh Tông (1442–1497), emperor of the Lê dynasty who actively promoted Confucian learning and the Chinese bureaucratic system in his state, in addition to having authored several books in Literary Chinese. Thánh Tông di thảo in two volumes contains 19 tales in the truyền kỳ (Chuanqi genre).

The authorship is very much in dispute. Scholars generally agree that even if Lê Thánh Tông wrote some versions of some stories, this current work has definitely been edited by someone much later than him. Historian Trần Văn Giáp believes the book was created during the 19th or early 20th century, probably after 1893. One story was likely modeled after a Chinese story in Strange Stories from a Chinese Studio (1740).
