= Institute of Hán-Nôm Studies =

Research institute in Vietnam

- Viện nghiên cứu Hán Nôm 院研究漢喃
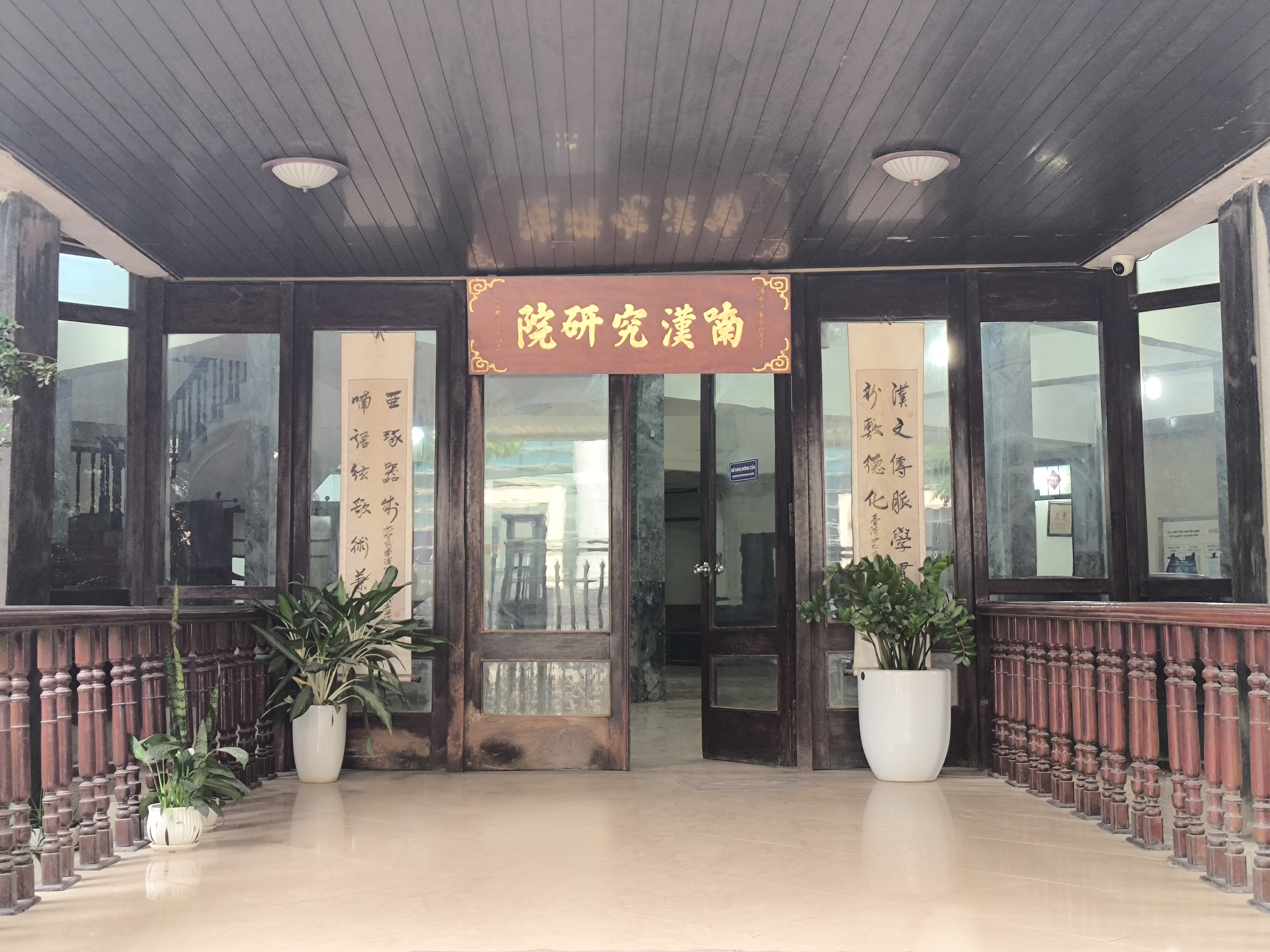
- Formation: 1970 (foundation); 1979 (institute status)
- Type: GO
- Legal status: Active
- Purpose: Language researching
- Headquarters: Hanoi, Vietnam
- Location: No.183 Đặng Tiến Đông street, Trung Liệt ward, Đống Đa district, Hanoi, Vietnam
- Coordinates: 21.014327352670257°N 105.82208121871022°E
- Official language: Vietnamese
- Director: Dr. Vương Thị Hường (王氏紅)
- Staff: 66
- Website: hannom.vass.gov.vn
- Formerly called: the Department of Hán and Nôm

Institute of Hán-Nôm Studies

Vietnamese name
- Vietnamese: Viện nghiên cứu Hán Nôm
- Hán-Nôm: 院研究漢喃

The Institute of Hán-Nôm Studies (Vietnamese: Viện nghiên cứu Hán Nôm; Hán Nôm: 院研究漢喃), or Hán-Nôm Institute (Vietnamese: Viện Hán Nôm, Hán Nôm: 院漢喃) in Hanoi, Vietnam, is the main research centre, historical archival agency and reference library for the study of chữ Hán and chữ Nôm (together, Hán-Nôm) texts for Vietnamese language in Vietnam. These are texts predating the adoption of the Latin-based Vietnamese alphabet.

== History ==
The original nucleus of this agency was the Department of Hán and Nôm which was founded in 1970. In 1979, the Vietnamese government issued the 326/CP Decree elevating the Department of Hán and Nôm to institute status and renaming it as the Institute of Hán-Nôm Studies.

The ink rubbing collections which were holdings of the National Library of Vietnam were transferred to the Institute of Hán-Nôm Studies in 1984–1986. On 22 May 1993, the 23/CP Decree confirmed the institute's status as a subsidiary of the National Center for Social Sciences and Humanities of Vietnam.

Hán-Nôm (漢喃) is the whole corpus of premodern written materials, both in Hán (classical Chinese used in Vietnam) and Nôm (the vernacular logographic Vietnamese script), together grouped as Hán-Nôm writings. Being a part of the Vietnam Academy of Social Sciences, the institute sets out with two goals: the preservation of historical Hán-Nôm texts, and conduct systemic linguistic, literary and historical research on these holdings.

== Institute ==
The institute's responsibilities include searching, storing, copying, translating, studying and publishing Hán-Nôm heritages and data, training Hán-Nôm researchers, sustaining Hán-Nôm-related services and enhancing cultural exchange and cooperation with foreign academic circles.

Currently the institute has 66 employees, among which there are 1 professor, 5 associate professors, 16 doctors and 7 masters, along with 25 researchers and service personals.

Its departments are classified as following:

- 5 offices on scientific researching
  - the Office of Philology
  - the Office of Regional and Ethnic Documents
  - the Office of Colophon
  - the Office of Ancient Books
  - the Office of Study and Application of Hán-Nôm
- 6 offices on scientific services
  - the Office of Data Preservation
  - the Office of Data Searching
  - the Office of Information Application
  - the Office of Library and Communicating Information
  - the Office of Duplication
  - the Office of Integrated Administration

In addition, the institute publishes four editions of Hán-Nôm Studies magazine every year to provide scholastic trends and research findings of Hán-Nôm.

== Cultural exchanges ==
In 2005, a delegation led by Prof. Zhang Liwen (張立文) and Peng Yongjie (彭永捷) from the Confucius Institute of the Renmin University of China arrived at the Institute of Hán-Nôm Studies, both sides signed the Agreement on Cooperatively Compiling the Confucian Canon of Vietnam. In 2006, Doctor Phan of the Hán-Nôm Institute paid a return visit and discussed the book's compilation with the Renmin University of China. Like the Confucian Canon of Korea (韓國儒典), the Confucian Canon of Vietnam (越南儒典) is a part of the International Confucian Canon (國際儒典) – an important, East Asian Studies-oriented project of the Confucius Institute at the Renmin University of China.

In 2010, three years after the joint compilation of the Hán-Nôm Institute and the Fudan University, Shanghai, the Collection of Vietnamese's Long Journey to the Yan in Classical Chinese (越南漢文燕行文獻集成, in which Yan means Yanjing, an ancient city located in modern Beijing) was published by Fudan University Press. On June 13, the two organizations held a new book launch, which was attended by Trịnh Khắc Mạnh, Ge Zhaoguang (葛兆光, the dean of the National Institute for Advanced Humanistic Studies of Fudan University), other leaders of the university and local officials.

The Collection of Vietnamese's Long Journey to the Yan in Classical Chinese included the records of Vietnamese envoys' trip to China during the period of the Trần, Later Lê, Tây Sơn and Nguyễn dynasties of Vietnam. In their journeys, the envoys traveled from place to place, chanting poetry, painting pictures and even communicating with other envoys from Joseon and the Ryukyu Kingdom. These are regarded as proofs of early cultural exchanges between countries in East Asia and bases of the development of the Sinic world.

== Library ==
The Hán-Nôm Institute stores manuscripts dating from approximately 14th century to 1945. There are 20,000 ancient books among all the collections, most of them are in Nôm script (including the Nôm of Kinh, Nùng and Yao) and traditional Chinese characters. Besides, the institute also has 15,000 woodblocks and 40,000 rubbings from stele, bronze bells, chime stones and wooden plates, the history of which can be traced back to 10th to 20th century.

About 50% of the institute's collections are Vietnamese works of literature. The rest includes volumes related to geography, Buddhism and epigraphy, etc. The catalogue is available both in Chinese and French, so researchers who cannot understand Vietnamese are able to use and study the resources with no difficulty.

Unfortunately, the library has only Vietnamese forms and, apart from a few senior personnel, many librarians speak neither Chinese nor English.

Before accessing the library, visitors are suggested to e-mail a senior librarian. One should submit two passport photos on arrival and pay 30,000 dong to maintain a 6-month readership. A graduate student will have to provide a letter of recommendation from one's supervisor.

The opening hours of the library is 8:30 am – 11:45 am, 2:00 pm – 4:15 pm through Mondays to Thursdays and 8:30 am – 11:45 am on Fridays. The request of books has a maximum of ten per day and asking for permission is required if one wants to take away the photography of manuscripts, except those with maps which are not allowed to be photographed. Photocopying service, which also needs permission, is priced at 2,000 đồng per page.

As of 2017, photocopies of pages are priced at 5,000 đồng per page, while scans are 15,000 đồng per page.

== Scriptures stored ==
In 2008, Takeuchi Fusaji (武内 房司), a professor of Chinese History at the Department of Literature of Gakushuin University, Japan, published a research paper entitled Transmission of the Chinese Sectarian Religion and its Vietnam Adaptation: an Introduction of the Scriptures of the Institute of Han-Nom Studies of Vietnam. It introduced some ancient, Chinese religious culture-related books collected by the Hán-Nôm Institute. The paper itself was translated into Chinese by the Qing History Journal of Renmin University of China in 2010.

The books mentioned by Takeuchi's paper include:

- The Scripture of Eradicating Puzzles (破迷宗旨): resisting the lure of wealth and status, an old man called Rutong (儒童) engaged in benefactions and eventually became a nobleman in 'the Abode of Immortals' of supernatural beings.
- The Queen Mother's Repentance of Removing Ill Fortunes and Saving the World (瑤池王母消劫救世寶懺): the record of oracles during the Gods Worshipping Ceremony at Kaihua Fu, Yunnan of China in June 1860 was made into scriptures and was collected by the famous Ngọc Sơn Temple at Hanoi. The Temple was allegedly constructed in Lê dynasty.
- The Holy Scripture of Maitreya's Succouring the World (彌勒度世尊經) and the Narration of Maitreya's Real Scriptures (彌勒真經演音): Siddhārtha Gautama gained the chance to rule the world but caused disasters due to his incompetence, then Maitreya salvaged all living creatures. (Such stories are different from orthodox sutras)

== Scandals ==
On June 22, 2017, Dr. Nguyễn Xuân Diện had found out that about 1,702 books from the institute had found their way to an electronic library managed by Nguyễn Phúc Anh, a lecturer in the Hán Nôm department.

On December 21, 2022, the institute released a statement saying that it had lost 25 books including books such as Toàn Việt thi lục (全越詩錄), a large collection of poetry complied by Lê Quý Đôn and Việt âm thi tập (越音詩集).

On March 20, 2023, the institute announced that it was missing 121 books.

In August 2025, the dismissal of Hoàng Phương Mai and her subsequent death by suicide sparked public outrage. The controversy focused on allegations that the institute had treated her unfairly after she challenged her performance evaluations and appealed her dismissal in March 2025.

== See also ==
- The Vietnamese Nôm Preservation Foundation, a similar organization in Cary, North Carolina, the United States.
