= Emojli =

2014–2015 social media mobile application

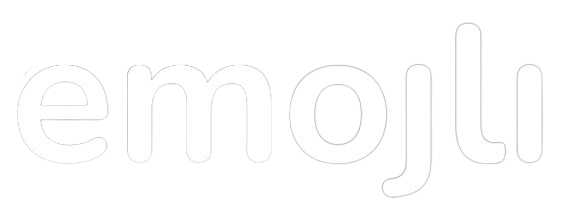

- Developers: Tom Scott; Natalie Gray
- Release: iOS: 29 August 2014 (12 years ago) – 31 July 2015 (11 years ago) Android: 30 January 2015 – 31 July 2015 (11 years ago)
- Written in: Backend: PHP; MySQL; Front end: HTML; CSS; JavaScript
- Operating system: iOS; Android
- Website: emoj.li

Emojli was a social media application for iOS and Android, created by YouTuber and web developer Tom Scott, and YouTuber and broadcast engineer Natalie Gray. While it was active, its principal feature was restricting usernames and messages to only contain emoji. When the app launched on 29 August 2014, 70,000 unique emoji-only usernames were reserved.

== History ==
Scott and Gray were inspired to create the app after seeing the success of Yo and the release of new emoji characters by the Unicode Consortium. During a talk at Electromagnetic Field Festival, the developers commented that the app originated largely as a joke, but that by the time of launch 70,000 unique usernames had been reserved. The app was launched on 29 August 2014. After press coverage the developers began receiving offers for venture capital.

Due to the cost and effort of maintaining the application, the developers closed the app on 30 July 2015.

== Development ==
The backend of the app was coded by Scott in PHP and MySQL and the frontend was designed and programmed by Gray in HTML, CSS and JavaScript.

The pair remarked that they ran into problems as not all web browsers supported emoji, and mobile operating system support for them varied. All work on the app was done in their spare time and took a little over a month.

The iOS version of the app was released on 29 August 2014. The Android version was released on 30 January 2015.

The app shut down on 30 July 2015 and will "not be resurrected".

== See also ==
- Tsuita – app where users may only use kanji
