= Trần Văn Giáp =

Vietnamese historian

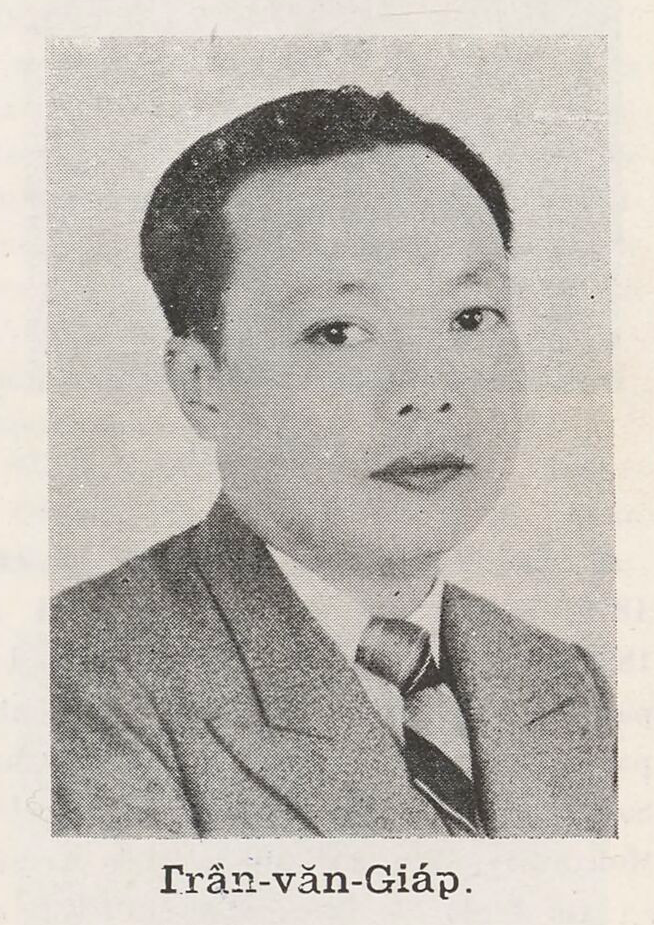
Portrait of Trần Văn Giáp

Trần Văn Giáp (chữ Hán: 陳文玾, 1902 - 25 November 1973) was a Vietnamese historian who wrote the first widely published histories of Buddhism in Vietnam in French. The two volumes, for Annam and Tonkin respectively were published in Paris in 1932. Giáp was an authority on Hán-Nôm (i.e. both chữ Hán and chữ Nôm) literature. On his return to Vietnam he published various other histories in Vietnamese, both in Latin alphabet chữ Quốc ngữ and chữ Nho.

== Works ==
- Le Bouddhisme en Annam des origines au XIIIè siècle 1932
- Esquisse d'une histoire du Bouddhisme au Tonkin 1932
- Les chapitres bibliographiques de Lê Quý Đôn et de Phan Huy Chú 1938
- Vần Quốc ngữ 1938
- Lược khảo về khoa cử Việt Nam 1941
- Relation d'une ambassade annamite en Chine au XVIII siècle 1941
- Hán văn trích thái diễn giảng khóa bản 1942 (written in chữ Nho)
- Hà Nội Viễn Đông khảo cổ học viện hiện tàng Việt Nam Phật điển lược biên 1943 (written in chữ Nho)
- Lịch sử Trung Quốc 1956
- Lịch sử cận đại Trung Quốc 1956
- Nguyễn Trãi quốc âm thi tập 1957
- Việt sử thông giám cương mục 1957 (translated with Hoa Bằng and Phạm Trọng Điềm)
- Bích Câu Kỳ ngộ khảo thích 1958
- Lưu Vĩnh Phúc, tướng Cờ Đen 1958
- Vân đài loại ngữ 1962
- Lược truyện các tác gia Việt Nam 1962
- Từ điển tiếng Việt 1967
- Nguyễn Trãi toàn tập 1969
- Phong thổ Hà Bắc 1971
- Tìm hiểu kho sách Hán Nôm
- Ngọc Kiều Lê 1976
- Lược khảo vấn đề chữ Nôm 2002 (posthumous, edited by Lê Văn Đặng)
