= Brushtalk =

International use of Literary Chinese

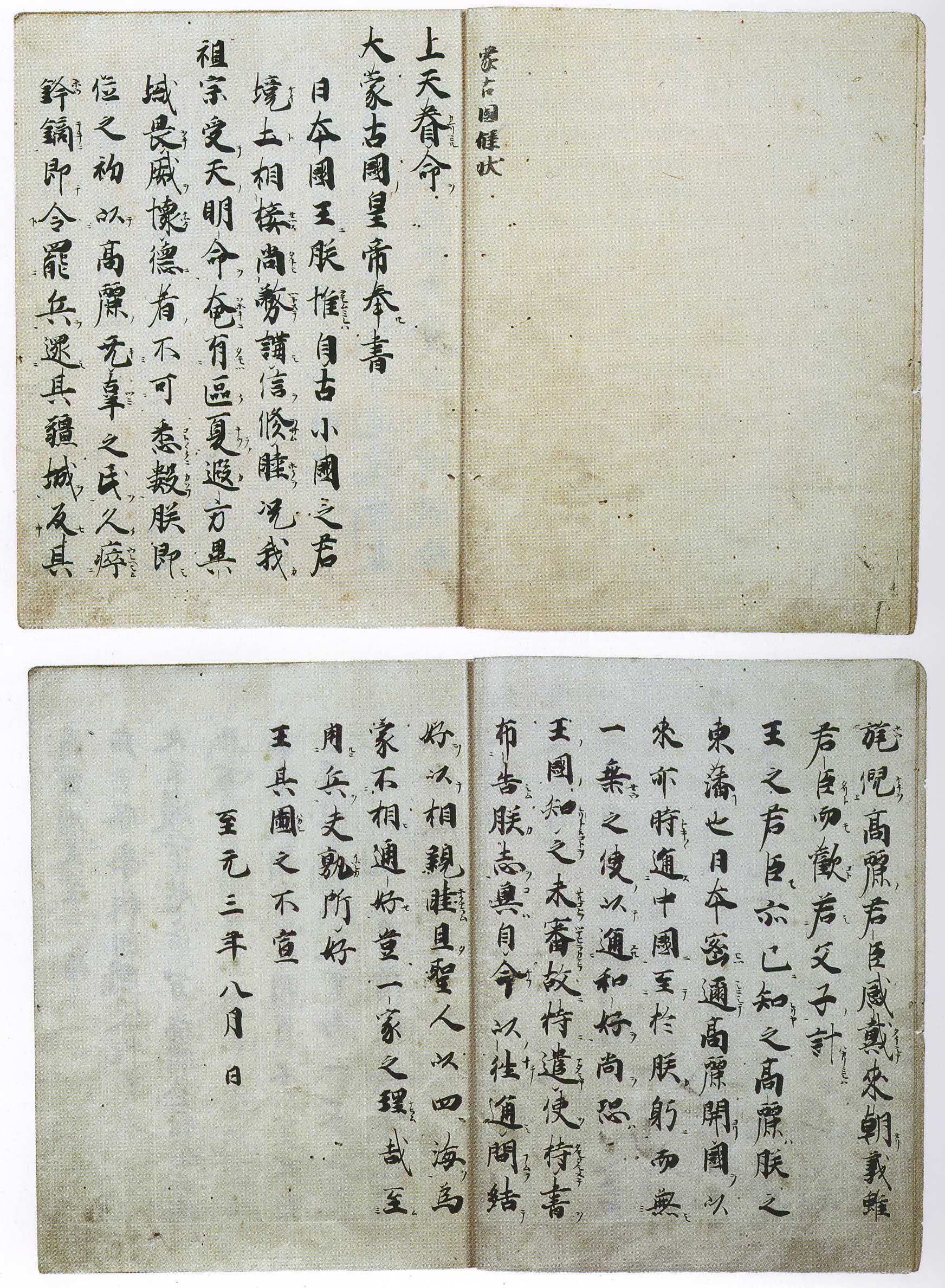
- Picture of a letter in Literary Chinese from Kublai Khan to the emperor of Japan before the Mongol invasions of Japan

Chinese name
- Traditional Chinese: 筆談
- Simplified Chinese: 笔谈
- Literal meaning: to converse in brush
Transcriptions
Standard Mandarin
- Hanyu Pinyin: bǐtán
- IPA: pi²¹⁴⁻²¹ tʰän³⁵
Wu
- Romanization: 7piq 6de
Hakka
- Romanization: bid5 tam2
- Pha̍k-fa-sṳ: pit thàm
Yue: Cantonese
- Jyutping: bat1 taam4
- IPA: pɐt̚⁵ tʰaːm²¹
Southern Min
- Hokkien POJ: pit-tâm
- Teochew Peng'im: big4 tam5
Eastern Min
- Fuzhou BUC: bék dàng
Northern Min
- Jian'ou Romanized: bĭ tǎng
Middle Chinese
- Middle Chinese: pit dam

Alternative Chinese name
- Traditional Chinese: 漢字筆談
- Simplified Chinese: 汉字笔谈
Transcriptions
Standard Mandarin
- Hanyu Pinyin: Hànzì bǐtán
Yue: Cantonese
- Jyutping: Hon3 zi6 bat1 taam4
Southern Min
- Hokkien POJ: Hàn-jī pit-tâm

Second alternative Chinese name
- Traditional Chinese: 漢文筆談
- Simplified Chinese: 汉文笔谈
Transcriptions
Standard Mandarin
- Hanyu Pinyin: Hànwén bǐtán
Yue: Cantonese
- Jyutping: Hon3 man4 bat1 taam4
Southern Min
- Hokkien POJ: Hàn-bûn pit-tâm

Vietnamese name
- Vietnamese alphabet: bút đàm
- Chữ Hán: 筆談

Korean name
- Hangul: 필담
- Hanja: 筆談
Transcriptions
- Revised Romanization: pildam

Japanese name
- Kanji: 筆談
- Kana: ひつだん
Transcriptions
- Romanization: hitsudan

Brushtalk is a form of written communication using Literary Chinese to facilitate diplomatic and casual discussions between people of the countries in the Sinosphere, which include China, Japan, Korea, and Vietnam.

== History ==
Brushtalk was first used in China as a way to engage in "silent conversations". Beginning from the Sui dynasty (581 to 618), the scholars from China, Japan, Korea, and Vietnam could use their mastery of Classical Chinese to communicate without any prior knowledge of spoken Chinese.

The earliest and initial accounts of Sino-Japanese brushtalk date back to during the Sui dynasty. By an account written in 1094, minister Ono no Imoko was sent to China as an envoy. One of his goals there was to obtain Buddhist sutras to bring back to Japan. In one particular instance, Ono no Imoko had met three old monks. During their encounter, due to them not sharing a common language, they held a "silent conversation" by writing Chinese characters on the ground using a stick.

老僧書地曰：「念禪法師、於彼何號？」

The old monk wrote on the ground: "Regarding the Zen master, what title does he have there?"

妹子答曰：「我日本國、元倭國也。在東海中、相去三年行矣。今有聖德太子、无念禪法師、崇尊佛道，流通妙義。自說諸經，兼製義疏。承其令有、取昔身所持複法華經一卷、餘无異事。」

Ono no Imoko answered: "I am from Japan, originally known as the Wa country. Situated in the middle of the Eastern Sea, it takes three years to travel here. Currently, we have Prince Shōtoku, but no Zen master. He venerates the teachings of Buddhism, propagating profound teachings. He personally expounds upon various scriptures and creates commentaries on their meanings. Following his orders, I have come here to bring with me the single volume of the Lotus Sūtra that he possessed in the past, and nothing else."

老僧等大歡、命沙彌取之。須臾取經、納一漆篋而來。

The old monk and others were overjoyed and instructed a novice monk to retrieve it. After a moment, the scripture was brought in, placed in a lacquered box.

The Vietnamese revolutionary Phan Bội Châu in 1905-1906 conducted several brushtalks with several other Chinese revolutionaries such as Sun Yat-sen and reformist Liang Qichao in Japan during his Đông Du movement. During his brushtalk with Liang Qichao, it was noted that Phan Bội Châu was able to communicate with Liang Qichao using Chinese characters. They both sat at a table and exchanged sheets of paper back and forth. However, when Phan Bội Châu tried reading what he wrote in his Sino-Vietnamese pronunciation, the pronunciation was unintelligible to Cantonese-speaking Liang Qichao. They discussed topics mainly involving the pan-Asian anti-colonial movement. These brushtalks later led to the publishing of the book, History of the Loss of Vietnam written in Literary Chinese.

During one brushtalk between Phan Bội Châu and Inukai Tsuyoshi:

君等求援之事、亦有國中尊長之旨乎？若此君主之國則有皇系一人爲宜、君等曾籌及此事

Inukai Tsuyoshi: "Regarding the matter of seeking assistance, has there also been approval from the esteemed figures within your country? If the country is a monarchy, it would be appropriate to have a member of the imperial lineage. Have you all considered this matter?"

有之。

Phan Bội Châu: "Yes"

宜翼此人出境不無則落於法人之手。

Inukai Tsuyoshi: "It is advisable to ensure that this person leaves the country so that he does not fall into the hands of the French authorities."

此、我等已籌及此事。

Phan Bội Châu: "We have already considered this matter."

以民黨援君則可、以兵力援君則今非其辰「時」。... 君等能隱忍以待机会之日乎？

Okuma Shigenobu, Inukai Tsuyoshi, and Liang Qichao: "Supporting you in the name of the party [of Japan] is possible, but using military force to aid you is currently not opportune. Can you gentlemen endure patiently and await the day for seizing the opportunity?"

苟能隱忍、予則何若爲秦庭之泣？

Phan Bội Châu: "If I could endure patiently, what reason do I have not to weep for help in the Qin court?" (Note: "Weeping for help in the Qin court" was referring to a moment in Zuo Zhuan, where Shen Baoxu (Chinese: 申包胥) cried at the Qin court for seven days without eating. Duke Ai of Qin (Chinese: 秦哀公) moved by his actions sent troops to restore the Chu State（立依於庭牆而哭，日夜不絕聲，勺飲不入口，七日，秦哀公為之賦無衣，九頓首而坐，秦師乃出。）)

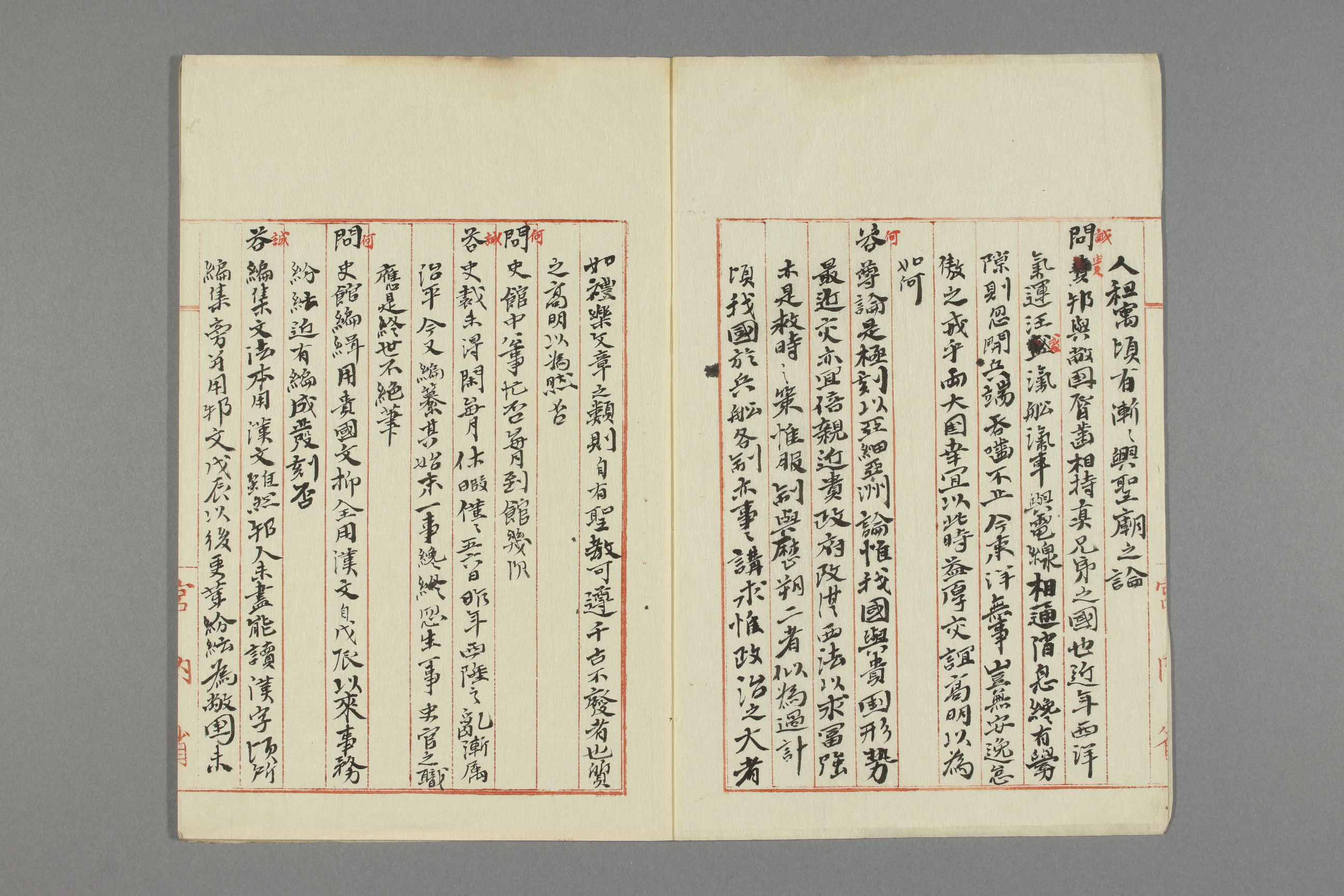
A brushtalk conversation between Qing diplomat He Ruzhang (何如璋) and Japanese bureaucrat Seiichirō Miyajima (宮島誠一郎).

About a hundred of Phan Bội Châu's brushtalks in Japan can be found in Phan Bội Châu's book, Chronicles of Phan Sào Nam (Vietnamese: Phan Sào Nam niên biểu; chữ Hán: 潘巢南年表).

There are several instances in the Chronicles of Phan Sào Nam that mentions brushtalks were used to communicate.

以漢文之媒介也

"used Literary Chinese as a [communication] medium"

孫出筆紙與予互談

"Sun [Yat-sen] took out a brush and paper so we could converse"

以筆談互問答甚詳

"using brushtalk, we engaged in serious and detailed question and answer exchanges."

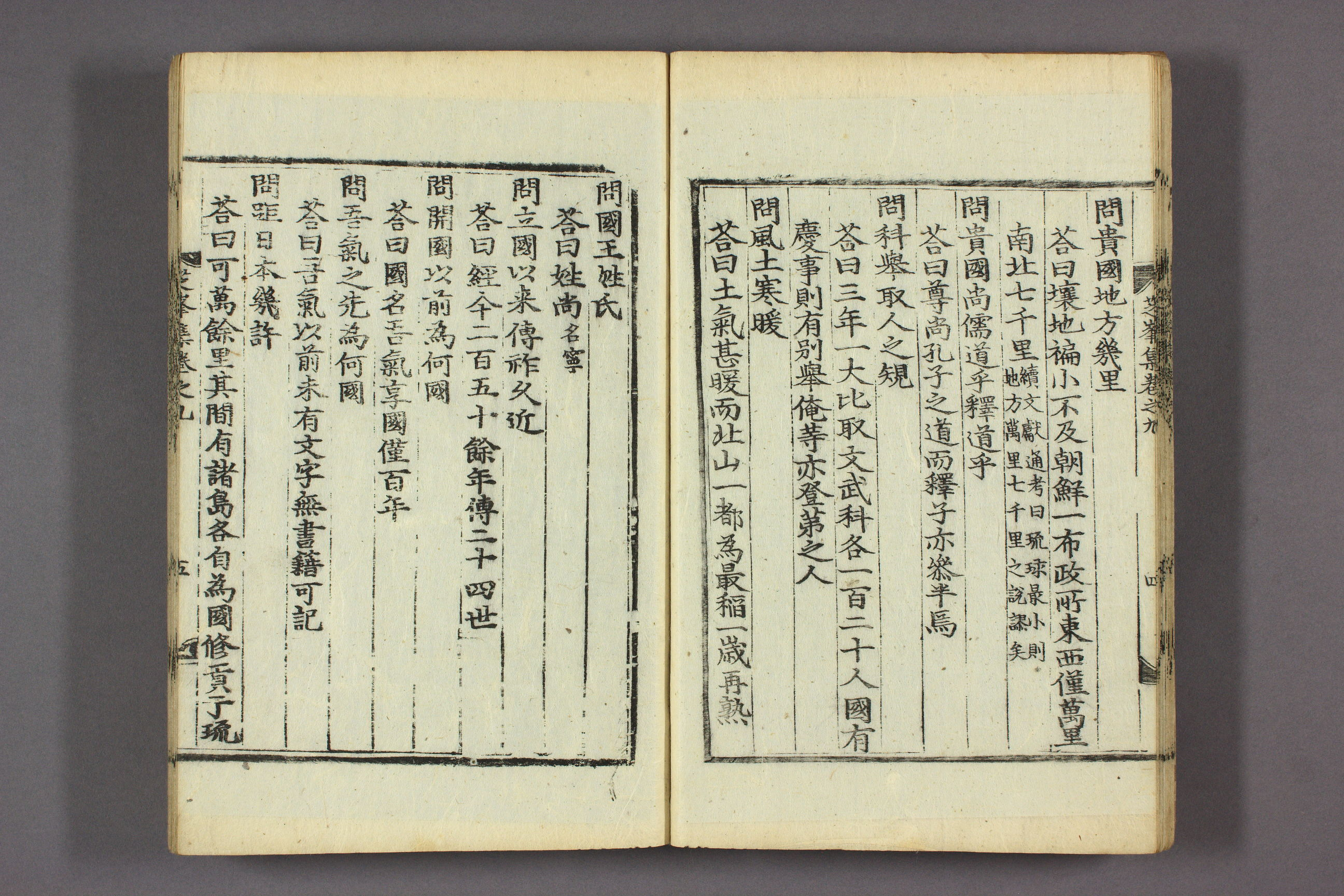
A page from 지봉선생집; 芝峯先生集; Jibongseonsaengjip recording question and answer (問答) brushtalks between Yi Su-gwang and Ryukyuan envoy Sai Ken (Okinawan: 蔡堅).

=== Pseudo-Chinese ===
Taro Kono, during his visit to Beijing in 2019, tweeted his schedule, but only using Chinese characters (no kana) as a way of connecting with Chinese followers. While the text is not like Chinese nor is it like Japanese, it was fairly understandable by Chinese speakers. It is a good example of Pseudo-Chinese and how the two countries can somewhat communicate with each other with writing. The tweet resembled how brushtalks were used in the past.

八月二十二日日程。同行記者朝食懇談会、故宮博物院Digital故宮見学、故宮景福宮参観、李克強総理表敬、中国外交有識者昼食懇談会、荷造、帰国。

Daily schedule of 22 August. Breakfast meeting with accompanying reporters, visit to the Forbidden City’s Digital Palace, visit to the Forbidden City’s Jingfu Palace, courtesy visit with Premier Li Keqiang, lunch meeting with experts on Chinese diplomacy, packing, and returning home.

== Examples ==
One famous example of brushtalk is a conversation between Vietnamese envoy Phùng Khắc Khoan and Korean envoy Yi Su-gwang meeting in Beijing to wish prosperity for the Wanli Emperor (1597). The envoys exchanged dialogue and poems between each other. These poems followed traditional metrics which was made up of eight seven-syllable lines (七言律詩). It is noted by Yi Su-gwang that out of the 23 people in Phùng Khắc Khoan's delegation, only one person knew spoken Chinese, meaning that the rest had to either use brushtalk or interpreters to communicate.

=== Two Poems in Presentation to the Envoys of Annam (贈安南國使臣二首) – Korean question ===
These poems were compiled in the eighth volume (권지팔; 卷之八) of Yi Su-gwang's book, Jibongseonsaengjip (지봉선생집; 芝峯先生集).

==== 贈安南國使臣其一 A Presentation to the Envoys of Annam, Part One ====
Hanja: 萬里來從瘴癘鄕 遠憑重譯謁君王 提封漢代新銅柱 貢獻周家舊越裳 山出異形饒象骨 地蒸靈氣產龍香 卽今中國逢神聖 千載風恬海不揚	Sino-Korean transcription: 만 리 래 종 장 려 향 원 빙 중 역 알 군 왕 제 봉 한 대 신 동 주 공 헌 주 가 구 월 상 산 출 이 형 요 상 골 지 증 령 기 산 룡 향 즉 금 중 국 봉 신 성 천 재 풍 념 해 불 양	Revised Romanization: Malli naejong jangnyeohyang Wonbing jungyeok algunwang Jebong handae sindongju Gongheon Juga gu Wolsang Sanchul ihyeong yosanggol Jijeung yeonggi sallyonghyang Jeukgeum Jungguk bongsinseong Cheonjae pungnyeom haeburyang	Sino-Vietnamese transcription: Vạn lý lai tòng chướng lệ hương Viễn bằng trọng dịch yết quân vương Đề phong hán đại tân đồng trụ Cống hiến chu gia cựu Việt Thường Sơn xuất dị hình nhiêu tượng cốt Địa chưng linh khí sản long hương Tức kim Trung Quốc phùng thần thánh Thiên tái phong điềm hải bất dương	English translation: From a land of mists and plagues, they have come from ten thousand miles away Relying on skilled translation, paying respects to the king Presenting a newly cast bronze pillar from the Han Dynasty Offering tribute, presenting the ancient attire of Việt Thường from the Zhou's lineage (Note: Việt Thường 越裳 refers to an ancient nation mentioned by Book of the Later Han, the location of Việt Thường is said to be in Northern Vietnam according to the Vietnamese history book, Đại Việt sử lược 大越史略.) Mountains yield strange forms, abundant are the bones of elephants The earth steams with spiritual energy, producing the fragrance of dragons Nowadays China encounters the divine and sacred A thousand years of calm winds, the sea does not ripple

==== 贈安南國使臣其二 A Presentation to the Envoys of Annam, Part Two ====
Hanja: 聞君家在九眞居 水驛山程萬里餘 休道衣冠殊制度 却將文字共詩書 來因獻雉通蠻徼 貢爲包茅覲象輿 回首炎州歸路遠 有誰重作指南車	Sino-Korean transcription: 문 군 가 재 구 진 기 수 역 산 정 만 리 여 휴 도 의 관 수 제 탁 각 장 문 자 공 시 서 래 인 헌 치 통 만 요 공 위 포 모 근 상 여 회 수 염 주 귀 로 원 유 수 중 작 지 남 차	Revised Romanization: Mungun gajae Gujingi Suyeok sanjeong malliyeo Hyudo uigwan sujedo Gakjang munja gongsiseo Naein heonchi tongman-yo Gongwi pomo geunsangyeo Hoesu Yeomju gwirowon Yusu jungjak jinamcha	Sino-Vietnamese transcription: Văn quân gia tại Cửu Chân cư Thuỷ dịch sơn trình vạn lý dư Hưu đạo y quan thù chế độ Khước tương văn tự cộng thi thư Lai nhân hiến trĩ thông man kiệu Cống vị bao mao cận tượng dư Hồi thủ Viêm Châu quy lộ viễn Hữu thuỳ trùng tác chỉ nam xa	English translation: I've heard your home is in Cửu Chân's dwelling (Note: Cửu Chân 九真 refers to an ancient Vietnamese province while Vietnam was under Chinese rule. It is now present-day Thanh Hóa Province.) A journey of ten thousand miles beyond water stations and mountains Do not speak of the different customs in attire and hats Instead, let us share words and poetic texts You came because of tribute to exchange pheasants through barbarian territories Your offerings of tribute become tokens of humble respect and conveyance of imperial significance Looking back, the return route to Yanzhou is distant (Note: Yanzhou 炎州 refers to a distant place in the South.) Who will once again construct the south-pointing chariot?

=== Reply to the Envoy of Joseon, Yi Su-gwang (答朝鮮國使李睟光) - Vietnamese response ===
These poems were compiled in Phùng Khắc Khoan's book, Mai Lĩnh sứ hoa thi tập (梅嶺使華詩集).

==== 答朝鮮國使李睟光其一 Reply to the Envoy of Joseon, Yi Su-gwang, Part One ====
Chữ Hán: 異域同歸禮義鄉 喜逢今日共來王 趨朝接武殷冠哻 觀國瞻光舜冕裳 宴饗在庭沾帝澤 歸來滿袖惹天香 唯君子識眞君子 幸得詩中一表揚	Sino-Vietnamese transcription: Dị vực đồng quy lễ nghĩa hương Hỉ phùng kim nhật cộng lai vương Xu triều tiếp vũ Ân quan hãn Quan quốc chiêm quang Thuấn miện thường Yến hưởng tại đình triêm đế trạch Quy lai mãn tụ nhạ thiên hương Duy quân tử thức chân quân tử Hạnh đắc thi trung nhất biểu dương	Sino-Korean transcription: 이 역 동 귀 례 의 향 희 봉 금 일 공 래 왕 추 조 접 무 은 관 한 관 국 첨 광 순 면 상 연 향 재 정 첨 제 택 귀 래 만 수 야 천 향 유 군 자 지 진 군 자 행 득 시 중 일 표 양	Revised Romanization: Iyeok donggwi yeuihyang Huibong geumil gongnaewang Chujo jeommu Eungwanhan Gwanguk cheomgwang sunmyeonsang Yeonhyang jaejeong cheomjetaek Gwirae mansu yacheonhyang Yugunjasik jingunja Haengdeuk sijung ilpyoyang	English translation: From different lands, yet arriving at the same place of courtesy and righteousness Joyously encountering today's gathering before the king Hastening to court, meeting with honoured headgear and wide-brimmed hats Observing the state, gazing upon the splendor of the imperial attire, Feasting in the court, sharing in the grace of the emperor Returning with sleeves full of the fragrance of heaven Only true gentlemen can recognize genuine gentlemen Fortunate to be praised in poetry with a single verse

==== 答朝鮮國使李睟光其二 Reply to the Envoy of Joseon, Yi Su-gwang, Part Two ====
Chữ Hán: 義安何地不安居 禮接誠交樂有餘 彼此雖殊山海域 淵源同一聖賢書 交鄰便是信為本 進德深惟敬作輿 記取使軺回國日 東南五色望雲車	Sino-Vietnamese transcription: Nghĩa An hà địa bất an cư Lễ tiếp thành giao lạc hữu dư Bỉ thử tuy thù sơn hải vực Uyên nguyên đồng nhất thánh hiền thư Giao lân tiện thị tín vi bản Tiến đức thâm duy kính tác dư Ký thủ sử diêu hồi quốc nhật Đông nam ngũ sắc vọng vân xa	Sino-Korean transcription: 의 안 하 지 불 안 기 례 접 성 교 락 유 여 피 차 수 수 산 해 역 연 원 동 일 성 현 서 교 린 편 시 신 위 본 진 덕 심 유 경 작 여 기 취 사 초 회 국 일 동 남 오 색 망 운 차	Revised Romanization: Uian haji burangi Yejeop seonggyo nagyuyeo Picha susu sanhaeyeok Yeonwon dongil seonghyeonseo Gyorin pyeonsi sinwibon Jindeok simyu gyeongjagyeo Gichwi sacho hoegugil Dongnam osaek mang-uncha	English translation: Wherever one may reside, Uian is a place of tranquillity (Note: Uian 의안; 義安 first referred to an island historically under the control of Korea, but later fell to the control of the predecessor of the Ryukyu Kingdom during the Goguryeo–Sui War. In this context, it refers to Korea.) Through etiquette and sincere friendship, there's ample joy Though our origins differ by mountains and seas, Our deep connection stems from the teachings of sages Being good neighbors is rooted in trust Advancing virtues requires profound respect Remembering the day when the envoy departs for his homeland In the southeast, five-coloured clouds herald the return of the chariot

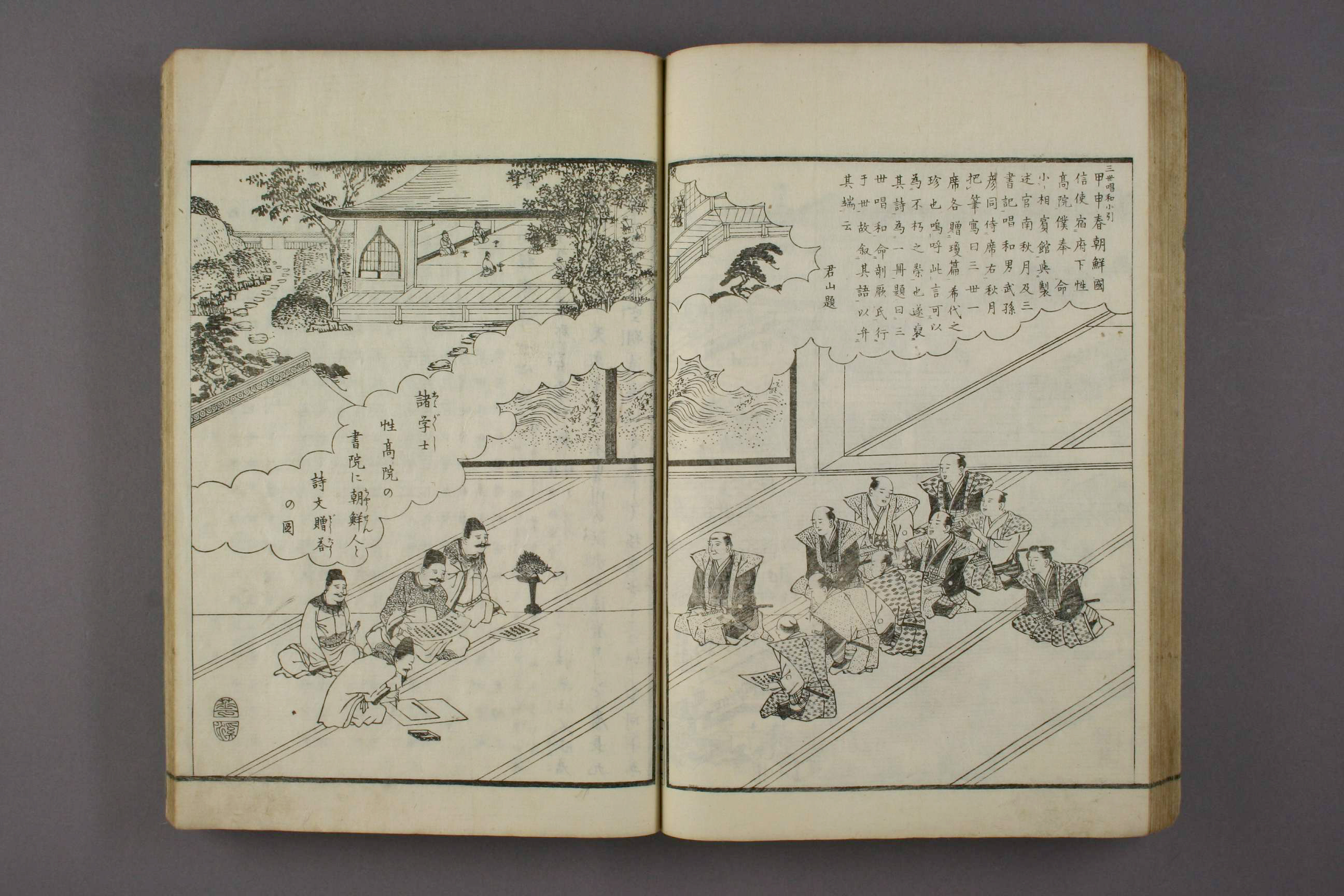
Japanese literati exchanging poems and brushtalks written in Literary Chinese with Korean visitors in Shōkōin Temple (勝光院) in 1764 (甲申). Depicted in Owari meisho zue .

=== Brushtalk with Lê Quý Đôn and I Sangbong ===
Another encounter with Korean envoy I Sangbong (Korean: 이상봉; Hanja: 李商鳳) and Vietnamese envoy Lê Quý Đôn on 30 December 1760, led to a brushtalk about the dress customs of Đại Việt, it was recorded in the third volume of the book, Bugwollok (북원록; 北轅錄),

（黎貴惇）副使曰：「本國有國自前明時、今王殿下黎氏、土風民俗、誠如來諭。敢問貴國王尊姓？」

The vice envoy (Lê Quý Đôn) said: "Our country has had its governance since the Ming Dynasty. Now, under the reign of His Royal Highness, the Lê family's local customs and traditions are indeed as mentioned. May I respectfully inquire about the surname of your esteemed royal highness?"

李商鳳曰：「本國王姓李氏。貴國於儒、佛何所尊尚？」

I Sangbong said: "In our country, the king's surname is I (李). In your esteemed country, what is revered and esteemed between Confucianism and Buddhism?"

黎貴惇曰：「本國並尊三教、第儒教萬古同推、綱常禮樂、有不容捨、此以為治。想大國崇尚亦共此一心也。」

Lê Quý Đôn said: "In our country, we equally respect the three teachings, but Confucianism, with its eternal principles, rites, and music, is universally upheld. These are considered essential for governance. I believe that even in great countries, the pursuit of such values is shared with the same sincerity."

李商鳳曰：「果然貴國禮樂文物、不讓中華一頭、俺亦慣聞。今覩盛儀衣冠之制、彷彿我東、而被髮漆齒亦有所拠、幸乞明教。」

I Sangbong said: "Indeed, the cultural artifacts of your esteemed country, especially in rituals, music, and literature, are no less impressive than those of China. I have heard about it before. Today, seeing the splendid ceremonial attire and the regulations for attire and headgear, it seems reminiscent of our Eastern customs. Even the hairstyles and the lacquered teeth has its own basis. Fortunately, I can inquire and learn more. Please enlighten me."

I Sangbong was fascinated with the Vietnamese custom of teeth blackening after seeing the Vietnamese envoys with blackened teeth.

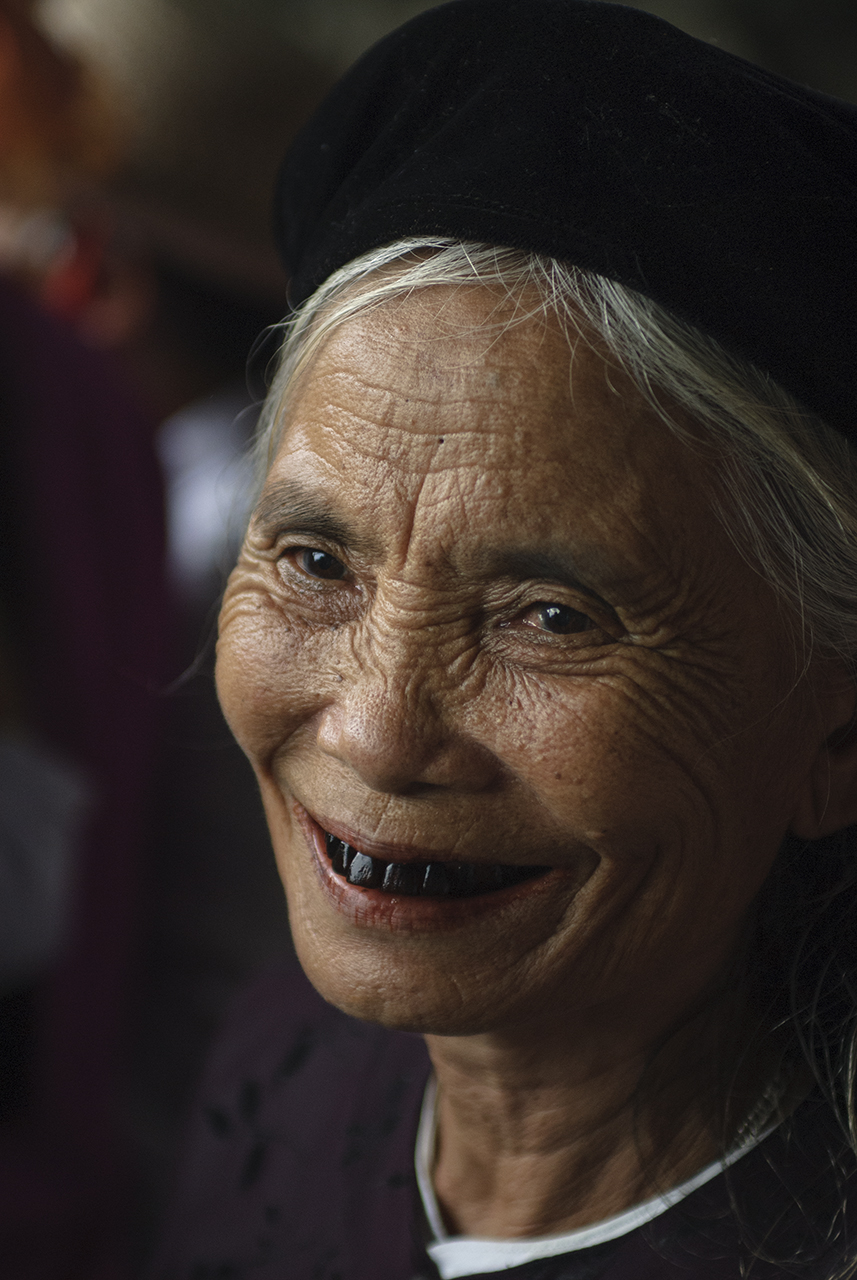
An old Vietnamese woman with blackened teeth.

A passage in the book, Jowanbyeokjeon (Korean: 조완벽전; Hanja: 趙完璧傳), also mentions these customs:

其國男女皆被髮赤脚。無鞋履。雖官貴者亦然。長者則漆齒。

In that country, both men and women all tie up their hair and go barefoot, without shoes or sandals. Even officials and nobility are the same. As for the respected individuals, they blacken their teeth.

The author Jo Wanbyeok (Korean: 조완벽; Hanja: 趙完璧) was sold to the Japanese by the Korean military, but since he was excellent in reading Chinese characters, the Japanese traders brought him along. From there, he was able to visit Vietnam and was treated as a guest by Vietnamese officials. His biography, Jowanbyeokjeon records his experiences and brushtalks with the Vietnamese.

=== Brushtalks between Japanese and Vietnamese ===
Maruyama Shizuo (丸山 静雄), a journalist working in Vietnam noted that he held brushtalks with locals in his book, The Story of Indochina (印度支那物語, Indoshina monogatari),

わたしは終戦前、ベトナムがまだフランスの植民地であったころ、朝日新聞の特派員としてベトナムに滞在した。わたしはシクロ（三輪自転車）を乗りついだり、路地から路地にわざと道を変えて、ベトナムの民族独立運動家たちと会った。大方、通訳の手をかり、通訳いない場合は、漢文で筆談したが、結構、それで意が通じた。いまでも中年以上のものであれば、漢字を知っており、わたしどもとも漢字で大体の話はできる。漢字といっても、日本の漢字と、二の地域のそれとはかなり違うが、漢字の基本に変りはないわけで、中国－ベトナム－朝鮮－日本とつながる漢字文化圏の中に、わたしどもは生きていることを痛感する。

"Before the end of the war (World War II), when Vietnam was still a French colony, I went to Vietnam as a correspondent for Asahi Shimbun. I rode a cyclo (three-wheeled bicycle taxi), deliberately traveling through alleys and lanes to meet with Vietnamese nationalists. Most of the time, I relied on interpreters, and when there was none, I communicated through brushtalks in Classical Chinese, which worked surprisingly well. Even now, anyone who is middle-aged or older knows Chinese characters, we can communicate roughly using Chinese characters. Speaking of Chinese characters, although they are quite different from those in Japan, the basics of Chinese characters remain unchanged. I am keenly aware that we are living in Chinese character cultural sphere that is connected to China, Vietnam, Korea, and Japan."

In the 18th century Japanese book, An Account of Drifting in Annam (安南国漂流記, Annan-koku Hyōryū-ki), mentions a drifter's account in Annam.

通候間、庄兵衛即テ日本水戸国と砂に書付見セ候得共、本之字不審之様子相見候故、本之字直ニ本と替候へハ合点之躰ニ御座候、其後飢に及候間食事あたへ呉候得と仕方ニて知らせ申候、先よりも色々言語いたし候得共少も通シ不申候、庄兵衛ハ船へ帰り其次第を知らせ、佐平太、十三郎も陸へ上りて米と云字を書て見セ候得者早速米四升計持来り候、悉飢候故四人とも打寄二握宛かみ候、又一握と手を掛ケ候所ニ里人共手を押へ、米ハ腹へあたり候間、飯を炊あたへべきとの仕方をいたし候間、我々も又船中の両人へ少シ給度と仕方でしらせ少々宛かまセ残をは炊セ候。

"During that time, Shōbē (庄兵衛) immediately wrote 'Japan, Mito Province' (日本水戸国) in the sand and showed it to the villagers. However, they did not recognize some of the characters, so when he rewrote the character for 'hon' (本) more clearly, they seemed to understand. Afterwards, since Shōbē and the others were hungry, he gestured to the villagers asking for food, but nothing was understood despite trying to communicate earlier by gestures. Shōbē returned to the boat and reported the situation. Saheita (佐平太) and Jūzaburō (十三郎) also went ashore, wrote the character for 'rice' (米) and showed it to them. Immediately, they brought about four shō (四升) of rice. Being extremely hungry, the four of them gathered and each took two handfuls to eat. When they reached out for another handful, the villagers held their hands and gestured that since raw rice is bad for the stomach, they should cook it first and give it to them. We then gestured that we would also like a little for the two men left on the boat, and the remaining rice was cooked for us."

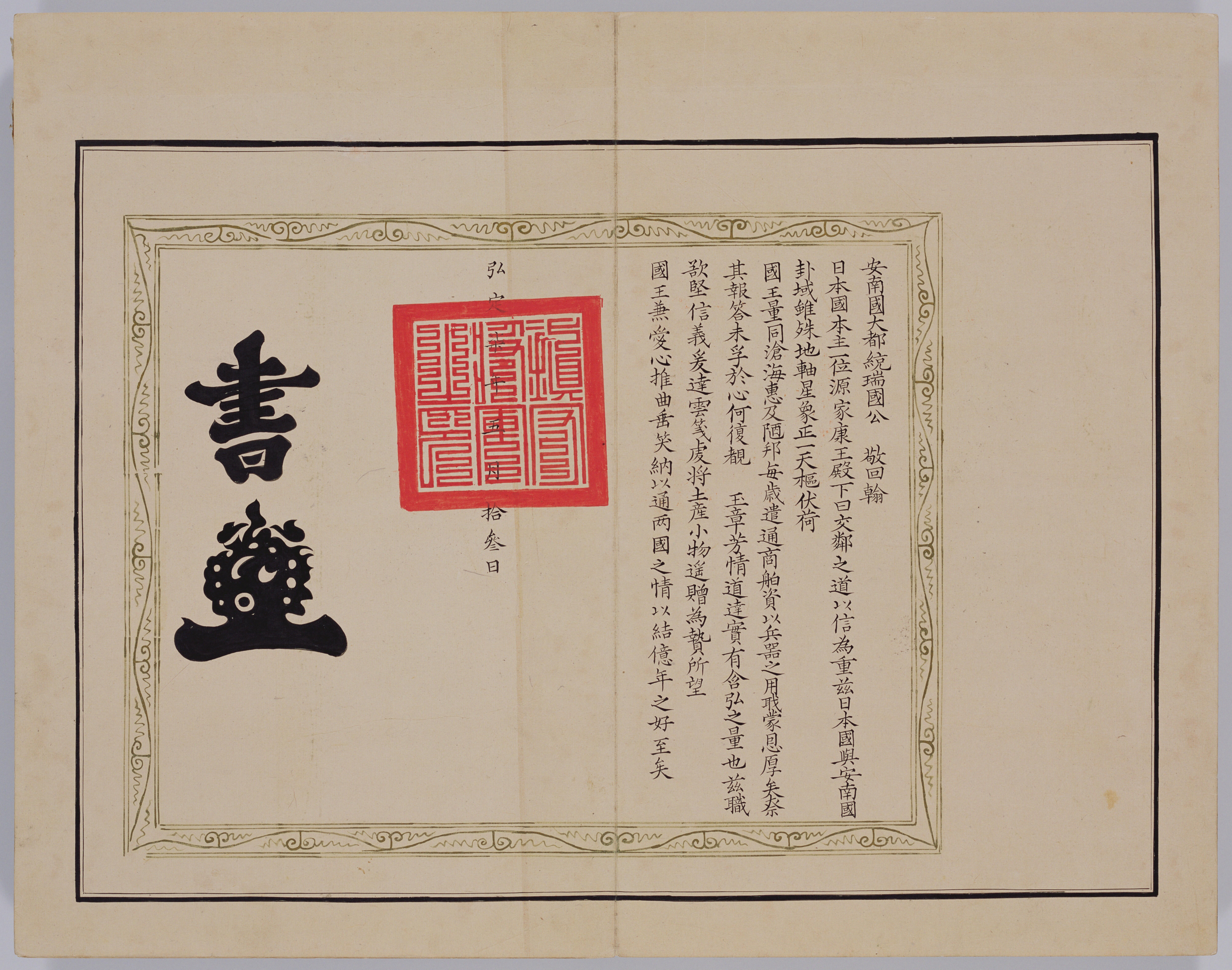
A copy of the 1607 letter sent by Nguyễn Hoàng to Tokugawa Ieyasu (源家康).

A letter sent from Nguyễn Hoàng to Tokugawa Ieyasu in 1607 shows the diplomatic relations between Japan and Vietnam during that period. The letter reads,

安南國大都統瑞國公、敬回翰。

日本國本主一位源家康王殿下曰。交鄰之道、以信為重。兹日本國與安南國、卦域雖殊、地軸星象、正一天樞。伏荷國王量同滄海、惠及陋邦、每歳遣通商舶資以兵噐之用、職蒙恩厚矣。奈其報答未孚於心、何復覩。玉章芳情道達、實有含弘之量也。兹職欲堅信義、爰逹雲箋、虔將土產小物遙贈為贄、所望國王兼愛心、推曲岳笑納、以通两國之情、以結億年之好、至矣。

弘定㭍年五月拾叁日

書 (seal)

From the Grand Commander of Annam, the Duke of Thuỵ State, I respectfully return this letter.

The sovereign of Japan, the senior first-rank lord Minamoto no Ieyasu, said: "In the way of maintaining neighbourly relations, trust is of utmost importance." Although the territories of Japan and Annam differ, our lands are aligned under the same celestial principles, sharing the same axis and stars, as if connected to the pivot of the heavens. I am deeply grateful to the king for his generosity, as vast as the sea, which has benefited my humble country. Each year, merchant ships are dispatched, bringing supplies, including those for military use, and I have received such generous treatment. However, my sense of gratitude remains unfulfilled, and I am unable to fully express my appreciation for the noble sentiments conveyed in the precious letter, which reflect the king’s benevolence. I wish to affirm my commitment to trust and loyalty, and thus send this letter with the utmost respect. I humbly present a small gift of local products from afar, hoping that the king will graciously accept it as a token of goodwill. It is my hope that this will further the friendship between our two nations and establish a bond that will last for countless years.

Written on the thirteenth day of the fifth month in the seventh year of Hoằng Định.

== In media ==
- A scene in The Partner, a 2013 Japanese-Vietnamese historical film, showed a brushtalk between Phan Bội Châu and Inukai Tsuyoshi.
- In the 2006 Japanese television drama Attention Please, episode 2 features a scene where Yōko Misaki (played by Aya Ueto) interacts with a Chinese traveler. They attempt to communicate using Chinese characters.

== See also ==
- Adoption of Chinese literary culture
- Classical Chinese
- Sino-Xenic vocabularies
