= History of writing in Vietnam =

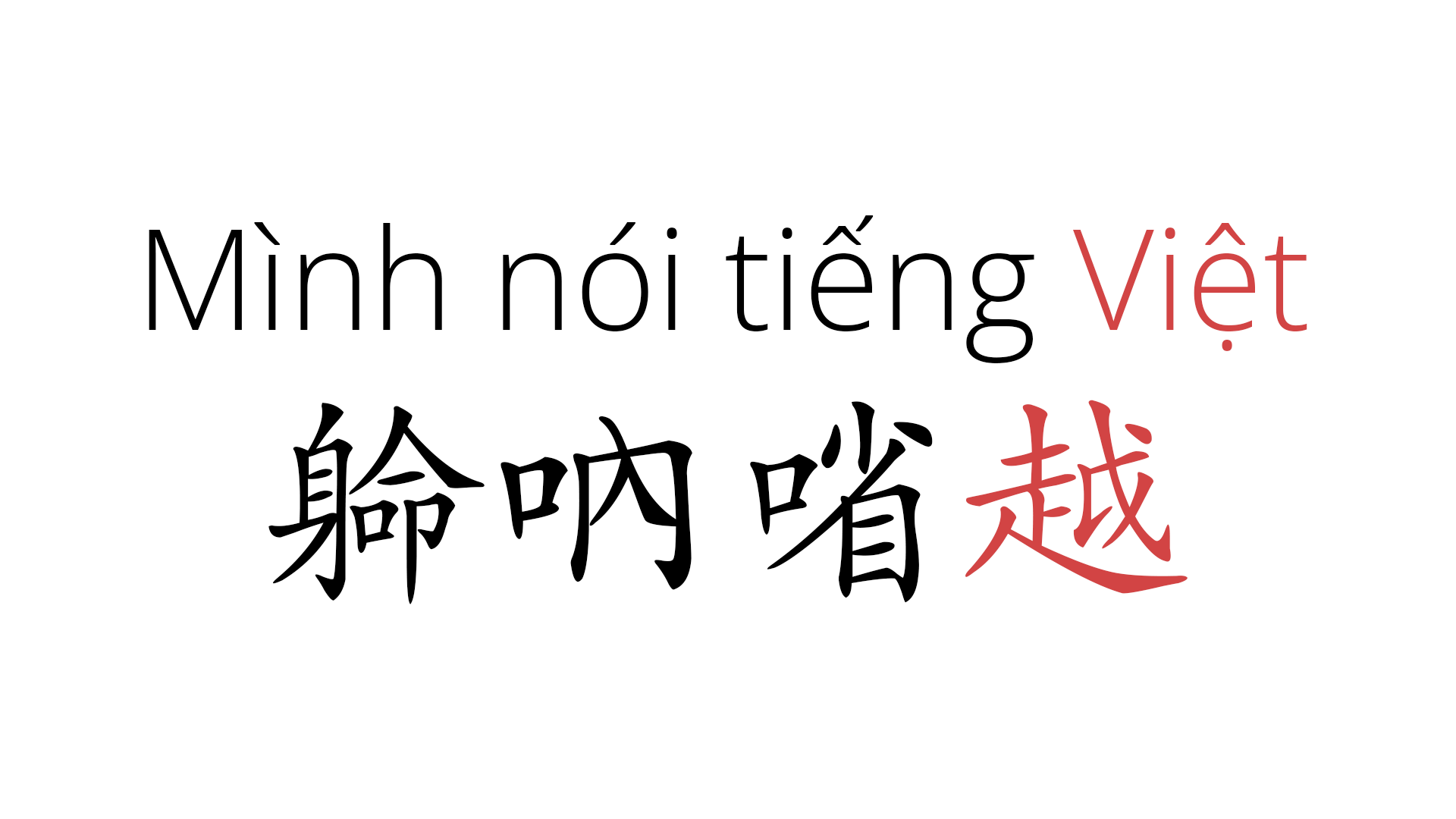
"I speak Vietnamese" (Mình nói tiếng Việt—𨉟呐㗂越) in chữ Quốc ngữ and chữ Nôm in black, and chữ Hán in red

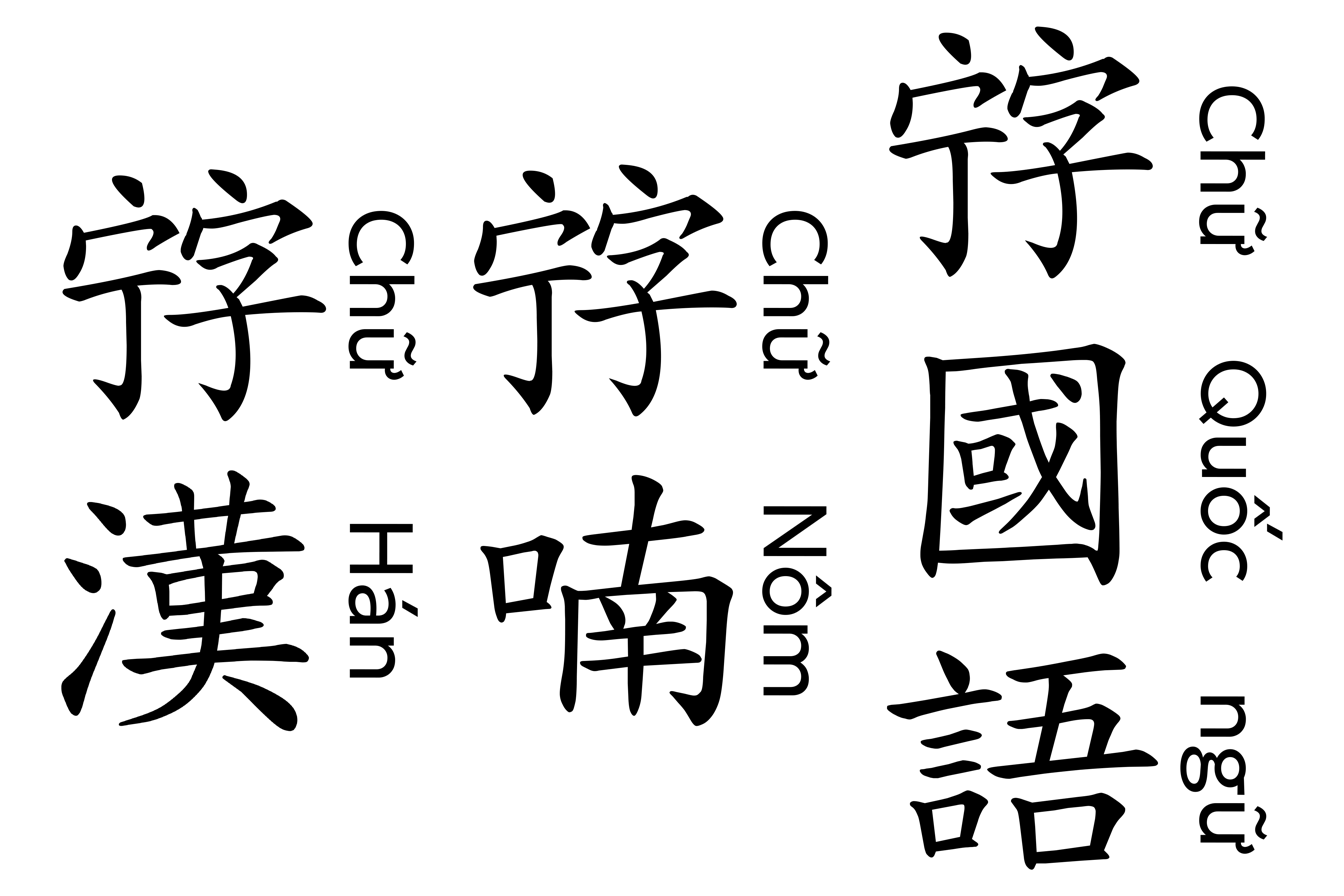
Current and past writing systems for Vietnamese in the Vietnamese alphabet and in chữ Hán Nôm

Written Vietnamese today uses the Latin script-based Vietnamese alphabet to represent native Vietnamese words (thuần Việt), Vietnamese words which are of Chinese origin (Hán-Việt, or Sino-Vietnamese), and other foreign loanwords. Historically, Vietnamese literature was written by scholars using a combination of Chinese characters (Hán) and original Vietnamese characters (Nôm). From 111 BC up to the 20th century, Vietnamese literature was written in Văn ngôn (Classical Chinese) using chữ Hán (Chinese characters), and then also Nôm (Chinese and original Vietnamese characters adapted for vernacular Vietnamese) from the 13th century to 20th century.

Chữ Hán were introduced to Vietnam during the thousand year period of Chinese rule from 111 BC to 939 AD. Texts in Vietnam were written using chữ Hán by the 10th century at the latest. Chữ Hán continued to be used as the official administrative script until the 19th century with the exception of two brief periods under the Hồ (1400–1407) and Tây Sơn (1778–1802) dynasties when chữ Nôm was promoted. Chữ Nôm is a blend of chữ Hán and unique Vietnamese characters to write the Vietnamese language. It may have been used as early as the 8th century but concrete textual evidence dates to the 13th century. Chữ Nôm never supplanted chữ Hán as the primary writing system and less than five percent of the educated Vietnamese population used it, primarily as a learning aid for chữ Hán and writing folk literature. Due to its unofficial nature, chữ Nôm was used as a medium for social protest, leading to several bans during the Lê dynasty (1428–1789). In spite of this, a sizable body of literature in chữ Nôm had accumulated by the 19th century, and these texts could be orally disseminated by individuals in villages.

The two concurrent scripts existed until the era of French Indochina when chữ Quốc ngữ, the Latin alphabet, gradually became the current written medium of literature. In the past, Sanskrit and Indic texts also contributed to Vietnamese literature either from religious ideas from Mahayana Buddhism, or from historical influence of Champa and Khmer.

== Terminology ==
In Vietnamese, Chinese characters go by several names, but all refer to the same script:

- Chữ Hán (𡨸漢) or Hán tự (漢字): "words of Hán" or "Hán characters/words". 漢字 is also pronounced as Hanzi in Standard Chinese, Hanja in Korean, and Kanji in Japanese.
- Hán văn (漢文): "Han writing" or "Han literature", also pronounced as Hanwen in Standard Chinese, Hanmun in Korean, and Kanbun in Japanese. Meaning Classical Chinese.
- Chữ Nho (𡨸儒, "words of Confucians").

The Vietnamese word chữ 𡨸 (character, script, writing, letter) is derived from a Middle Chinese pronunciation of 字 (Modern Mandarin Chinese in Pinyin: zì), meaning 'character'.

Từ Hán Việt (詞漢越, "Sino-Vietnamese words") refers to cognates or terms borrowed from Chinese into the Vietnamese language, usually preserving the phonology of the original Chinese that was introduced to Vietnamese. As for syntax and vocabulary this Sino-Vietnamese language was no more different from the Chinese of Beijing than medieval English Latin was different from the Latin of Rome. Its major influence comes from Vietnamese Literary Chinese (Chữ Hán).

The term chữ Nôm (𡨸喃, "Southern characters") refers to the former transcription system for vernacular Vietnamese-language texts, written using a mixture of original Chinese characters and locally coined Nôm characters not found in Chinese to phonetically represent local Vietnamese words, meanings and their sound. However, the character set for chữ Nôm is extensive, containing up to 37,000 characters, and many are both arbitrary in composition and inconsistent in pronunciation.

Hán Nôm (漢喃, "Hán and chữ Nôm characters") may mean both Hán and Nôm taken together as in the research remit of Hanoi's Hán-Nôm Institute, or refer to texts which are written in a mixture of Hán and Nôm, or some Hán texts with parallel Nôm translations. There is a significant orthographic overlap between Hán and Nôm and many characters are used in both Hán and Nôm with the same reading. It may be simplest to think of Nôm as the Vietnamese extension of Han characters.

The term chữ quốc ngữ (𡨸國語, "national language script") means Vietnamese written in the Latin alphabet.

== History ==
=== General history ===
Chữ Hán (Chinese characters), also known as chữ nho (Confucian script), were introduced to Vietnam during the thousand year period of Chinese rule from 111 BC to 939 AD. Although the earliest extant texts written in chữ Hán appeared in Vietnam by the 10th century, chữ Hán was the only known writing system in Vietnam at the time, and had likely been used in prior times. Chữ Hán continued to be used in Vietnam after the end of Chinese rule in the 10th century and was instated as the official court script in 1010 and 1174. The Confucian examination system in Vietnam was written in chữ Hán. It remained the official writing system of Vietnam until the 19th century with the exception of two brief periods under the Hồ (1400–1407) and Tây Sơn (1778–1802) dynasties when chữ Nôm gained ascendance.

Chữ Nôm is the adaptation of chữ Hán and creation of unique Vietnamese characters to transcribe the Vietnamese language based on approximations of Middle Chinese pronunciations. It is speculated that chữ Nôm appeared as early as the 8th century using chữ Hán to record elements of the Vietnamese language, however the earliest extant textual evidence of chữ Nôm dates to the 13th century. Chữ Nôm includes thousands of characters unique to Vietnamese not found in Chinese. Due to social circumstances and linguistic inefficiencies, chữ Nôm never replaced chữ Hán as the primary writing system in Vietnam and was only promoted during the short-lived Hồ (1400–1407) and Tây Sơn (1778–1802) dynasties. Less than five percent of the Vietnamese population used chữ Nôm and only did so as a learning aid for chữ Hán or writing folk literature. As a result of its marginalized nature and lack of institutional backing, chữ Nôm was used as a medium for social protest during the Lê dynasty (1428–1789), leading to its ban in 1663, 1718, and 1760. Gia Long, founder of the Nguyễn dynasty (1802–1945), supported chữ Nôm until he became emperor and immediately reverted to chữ Hán. Despite its limited usage, a sizable body of literature in chữ Nôm had accumulated by the 19th century, and served as a written medium for oral dissemination by individuals in villages.

The two concurrent scripts existed until the era of French Indochina when chữ Quốc ngữ, the Latin alphabet, gradually became the current written medium of literature. In the past, Sanskrit and Indic texts also contributed to Vietnamese literature either from religious ideas from Mahayana Buddhism, or from historical influence of Champa and Khmer.

=== Pre-writing ===
During ancient times, the ancestors of the Vietnamese were considered to have been Proto-Austroasiatic (also called Proto-Mon–Khmer) speaking people, possibly traced to the ancient Dong Son culture. Modern linguists describe Vietnamese as having lost some Proto-Austroasiatic phonological and morphological features that the original Vietnamese language had. This was noted in the linguistic separation of Vietnamese from Vietnamese-Muong roughly one thousand years ago.

=== Chữ Hán ===
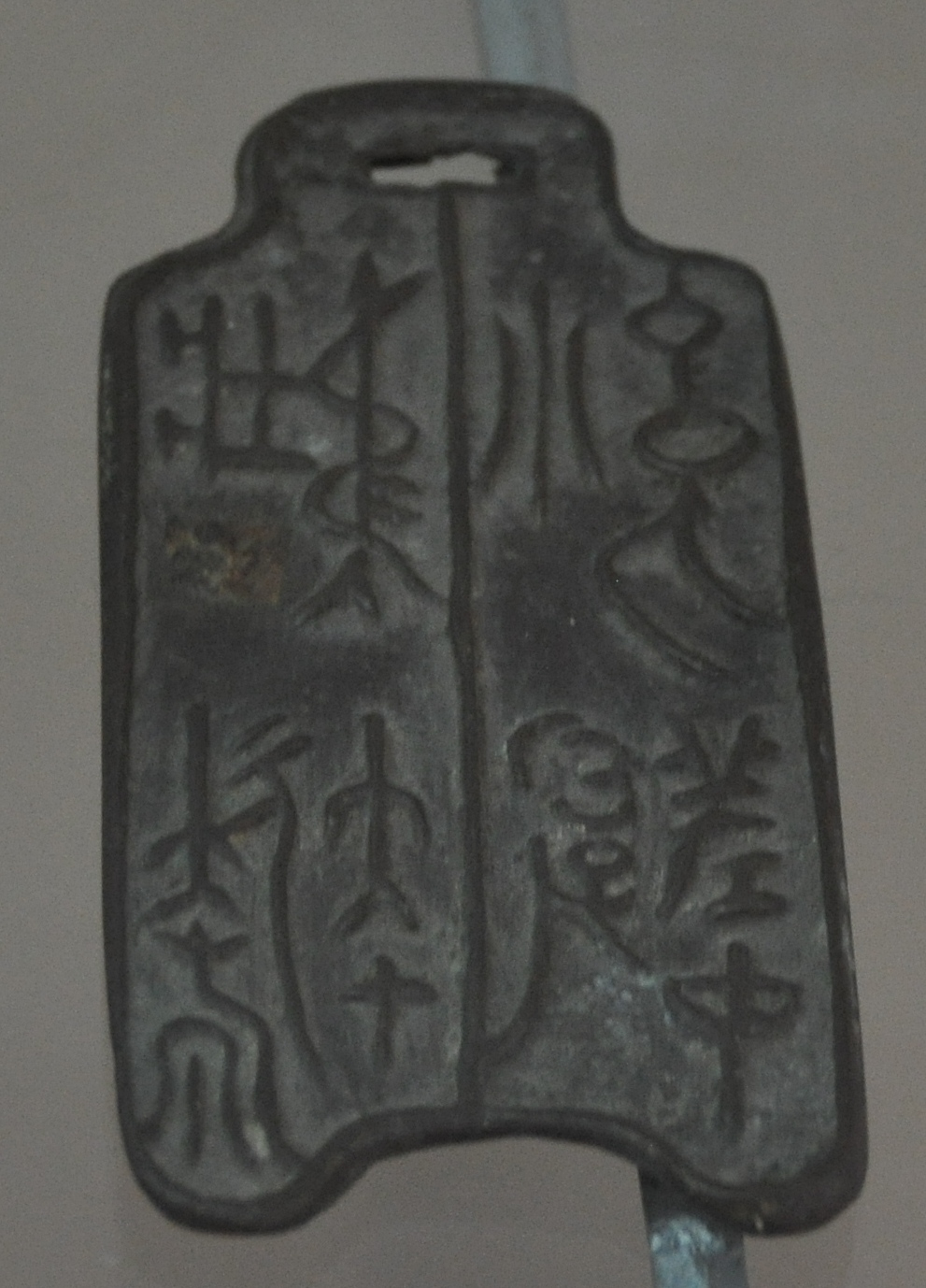
Bronze cash coin, 1st century AD with ancient Seal script

Chinese characters are specifically called chữ Hán (𡨸漢), chữ Nho (𡨸儒) or Hán tự (漢字, lit. 'Han character') in Vietnamese. Chữ Hoa or tiếng Hoa is commonly used to describe Mandarin Chinese, as well as tiếng Tàu for Chinese in general. Possibly even a thousand years earlier, in the late first millennium BC, Yuè elites in what is now southern China may have already adopted a form of writing based on Chinese characters to record terms from their own languages. During Chinese rule from 111 BC to 905 AD, Chinese characters were used as the official writing system of the region. Local texts written in Chinese probably also included some characters adapted to represent Proto-Viet-Mường sounds, usually personal names or Vietic toponyms that had no Chinese equivalent. According to some scholars, the adoption chữ Hán or Hán tự was started by Shi Xie (137–226), but many disagree.

The oldest extant poem in chữ Hán written by somebody from Vietnam was authored in 815 by Liêu Hữu Phương. Liêu had made the journey to the Tang dynasty capital of Chang'an to take the civil service examinations and failed, which he recounted in his poem. He passed the examination in the following year and received an official appointment. The poem is preserved in the Complete Tang Poems. By the time Vietnam became independent in 938, chữ Hán had become the official writing system of Vietnam without any consideration that it was a Chinese language. The Nam quốc sơn hà, a patriotic Vietnamese poem attributed to the Vietnamese general Lý Thường Kiệt (1019–1105), was said to have been read aloud as inspiration to Vietnamese troops before they fought victoriously against Chinese troops during the Song–Đại Việt war. The poem was written in Literary Chinese. It is unknown when exactly knowledge of Chinese texts became widespread in Vietnam, but a Song dynasty envoy who reached Vietnam in 987 recounts that a local monk was able to sing the last couplet of a poem written by Tang poet Luo Binwang (ca. 619–684?).

These writings were at first indistinguishable from contemporaneous classical Chinese works produced in China, Korea or Japan. These include the first poems in Literary Chinese by the monk Khuông Việt (匡越), the Nam Quốc Sơn Hà (南國山河), and many Confucian, Daoist, and Buddhist scriptures. Even after the invention of chữ Nôm, the adaptation of chữ Hán to write vernacular Vietnamese, educated men were still expected to have a good understanding of chữ Hán and to be able to compose poetry in it. Nguyễn Trãi (1380–1442) composed poetry in both writing systems. This familiarity with poetry in chữ Hán enabled Vietnamese envoys to communicate with envoys from as far away as Korea.

Chữ Hán became the official writing script of the court in 1010 and 1174. It was mainly used by the administration and literati. It continued to serve this role until the mid-19th century during French colonial rule when the traditional writing system was abolished in favour of transliterated chữ quốc ngữ.

==== Sino-Vietnamese readings of chữ Hán ====
In Vietnam, chữ Hán texts were read with the vocalization of Chinese text, called Hán văn (漢文), similar to Chinese on-yomi in Japanese kanbun (漢文), or the assimilated vocalizations in Korean hanmun (한문/漢文). This occurred alongside the diffusion of Sino-Vietnamese vocabulary into vernacular Vietnamese, and created a Sinoxenic dialect. The Sinologist Edwin G. Pulleyblank was one of the first linguists to actively employ "Sino-Vietnamese" to recover the earlier history of Chinese language.

=== Chữ Nôm ===
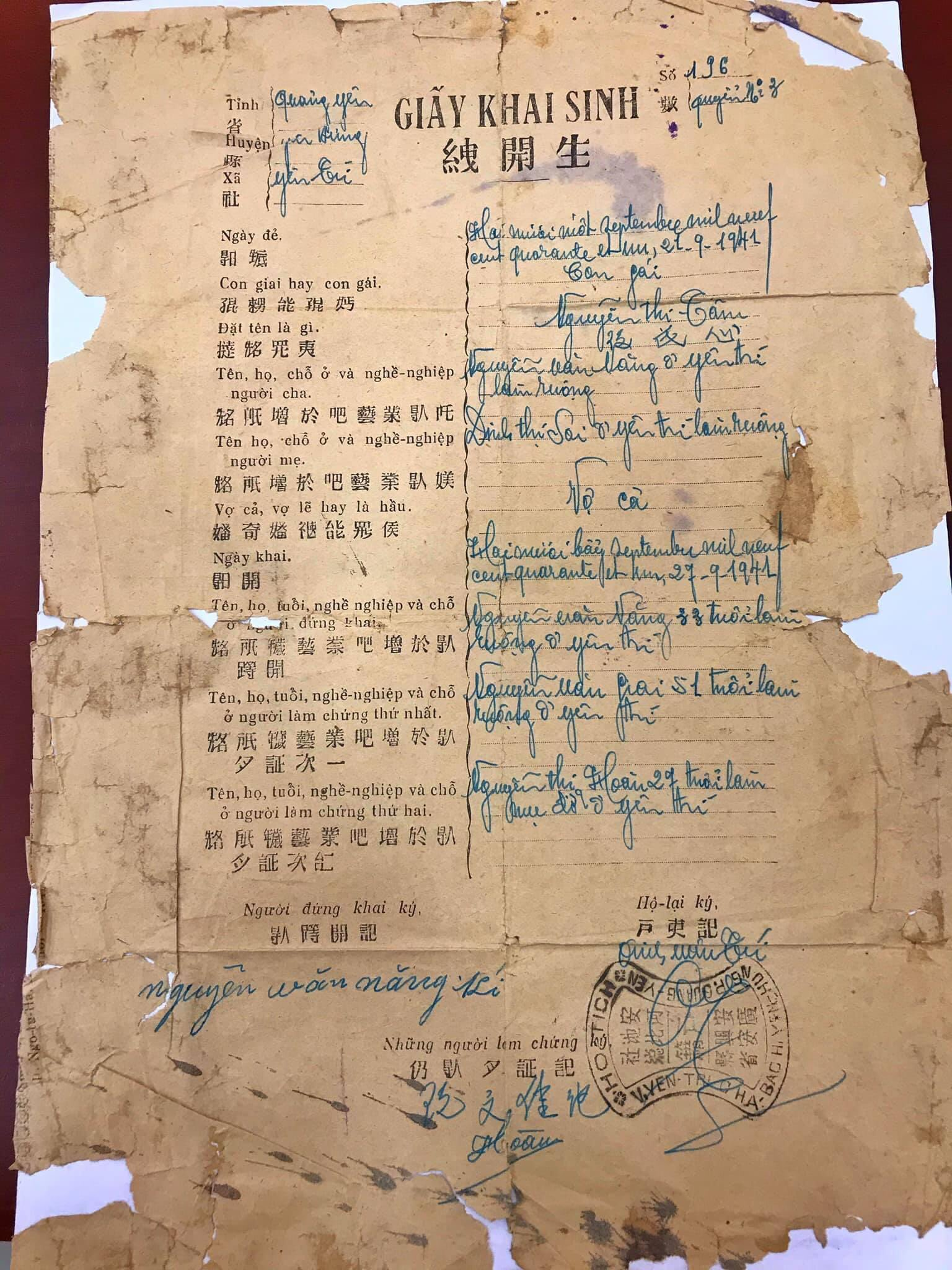
Vietnamese birth certificate in 1941 showing Vietnamese in two scripts, chữ Quốc ngữ and chữ Nôm.

From the 13th century, the dominance of Chinese characters began to be challenged by chữ Nôm, a different writing system based on the Chinese script to transcribe native Vietnamese words. These were even more difficult than Chinese characters themselves. Nôm script borrowed Chinese characters in their phonetic and semantic values to create new characters. Whilst designed for native Vietnamese words, Nôm required the user to have a fair knowledge of chữ Hán, and thus Nôm was used primarily for popular literature such as the poetry of Nguyễn Du and Hồ Xuân Hương, while almost all other official writings and documents continued to be written in Classical Chinese until the 20th century. According to language researcher Nguyen Thuy Dan, the majority of the Vietnamese elite up to the 19th century seem to have never written in anything but Classical Chinese and even criticized the use of Nôm.

While chữ Nôm had emerged by the 13th century, very few extant vernacular texts in Nôm predate the 15th century, and even many later texts in Nôm were translations or rewritings of works in chữ Hán. During the 15th and 16th centuries, reformist governments translated Chinese Classics into Nôm, but these translations have not survived due to being seen as subversive by successive governments. The Tây Sơn dynasty (1778–1802) mandated the use of Nôm in both government business and civil service examinations but their policy was reverted after the dynasty's collapse. In contrast, Minh Mạng (r. 1820–1841), the second emperor of the Nguyễn dynasty (1802–1945), prohibited the use of Nôm in both areas.

Poetry in Nôm was pioneered by Nguyễn Trãi (1380–1442). He wrote Vietnamese poetry in Nôm using the Chinese seven-syllable pattern. Later in the 17th century, Vietnamese poetry shifted towards a native pattern of alternating lines in six and eight syllables. The epic poem, The Tale of Kieu by Nguyễn Du (1765–1820), was written in Nôm.

While Nôm never replaced chữ Hán as the primary writing system, a growing number of Buddhist, Confucian, and moral texts had added vernacular explanations in Nôm by the 17th century. Some 19th century editions of Chinese classics also included translations in Nôm, later editions of Chinese fiction started including notes or translations in Nôm, while medical writers had to use Nôm to describe local plants not found in China.

As a result of its marginalized nature and lack of institutional backing, chữ Nôm was used as a medium for social protest during the Lê dynasty (1428–1789), leading to its ban in 1663, 1718, and 1760. Gia Long (r. 1802–1820), founder of the Nguyễn dynasty, supported chữ Nôm until he became emperor and immediately reverted to chữ Hán. Despite its limited usage, a sizable body of literature in chữ Nôm had accumulated by the 19th century, and served as a written medium for oral dissemination by individuals in villages.

=== Quốc âm tân tự ===
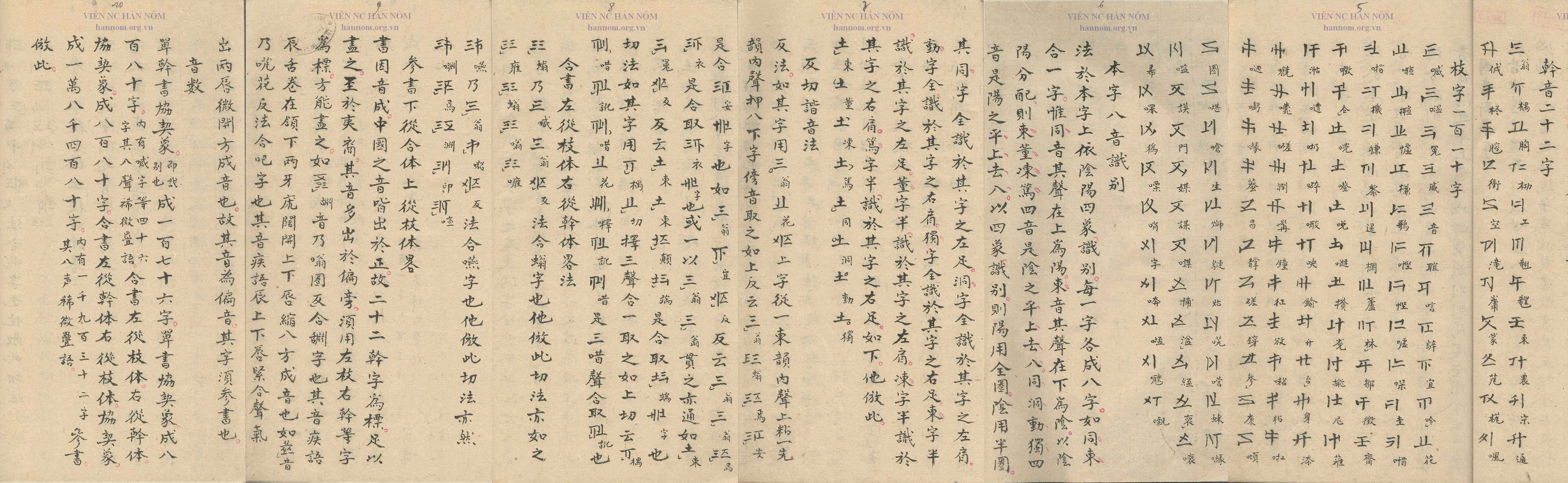
The syllabary "Quốc âm tân tự"

Quốc âm tân tự (chữ Hán: 國音新字), literally 'new script of national sound (language)', was a writing system for Vietnamese proposed in the mid-19th century. Two documents written on this type of script (four pages each) are kept at the Institute for the Study of Hán-Nôm: An older unnamed manuscript, and a more recent copy called Quốc âm tân tự (國音新字). There is no information in the text of the Quốc âm tân tự that indicates the specific date and year this work was written. Based on the fact that in the preface of the work the last stroke of the character "華" (Hoa) has been omitted due to naming taboo, it can be guessed that this text was written during the reign of Emperor Thiệu Trị (whose mother's name was "Hồ Thị Hoa" 胡氏華). At the end of the text's preface, there is a line "五星聚斗，南城居士阮子書" (Ngũ tinh tụ đẩu, Nam thành cư sĩ Nguyễn Tử thư; Written by Nguyễn Tử, a scholar of the Southern Citadel, on the Conjunction of the Five Planets).

Quốc âm tân tự is a type of phonetic syllabary script made from the strokes of chữ Hán and chữ Nôm, similar to Hiragana and Katakana of Japanese or Bopomofo in Chinese. Based on the pronunciation of Vietnamese, there are 22 cán tự (幹字) and 110 chi tự (枝字) ("cán" means trunk, "chi" means branches, "tự" means character). Cán tự is used to record the first consonant, and the chi tự is used to write the rhyme. Each character is named with a word that rhymes "ông" with the first consonant being the first consonant that the character signifies, for example, the word "đ" denotes the consonant "đ" is named "đông" (similar to today, the Vietnamese call the consonant "đ" the sound "đờ"). Quốc âm tân tự does not distinguish between "d" and "gi" as in the Vietnamese alphabet due to orthographic differences. There is a shank used to record the initial consonant /ʔ/, which is named "ông".

The author of Quốc âm tân tự used four stroke types: (一), (丨), (丶), (丿) (also including "㇏" as a variant of "丶") to create the characters. Every character (including all "trunk" and "branch" characters) has a total of four strokes. Most of the characters only use two or three stroke types, but the total number of strokes is exactly four.

Quốc âm tân tự uses the traditional "tone" division, the tones are divided into four categories: "bình" (平), "thượng" (上), "khứ" (去), "nhập" (入). Each type is further divided into two degrees, " âm" (陰) and "dương" (陽). The tones in the old classification were called âm bình 陰平 (ngang), dương bình 陽平 (huyền), âm thượng 陰上 (hỏi), dương thượng 陽上 (ngã), âm khứ 陰去 (sắc; for words that do not end in /p/, /t/, /c/ and /k/), dương khứ 陽去 (nặng; for words that do not end in /p/, /t/, /c/ and /k/), âm nhập 陰入 (sắc; for words that do end in /p/, /t/, /c/ and /k/), and dương nhập 陽入 (nặng; for words that do end in /p/, /t/, /c/ and /k/).

Traditional tone category		Traditional tone name	Modern tone name	Example
bằng 平 'level'	bình 平 'even'	âm bình 陰平	ngang	ma 'ghost'
bằng 平 'level'	bình 平 'even'	dương bình 陽平	huyền	mà 'but'
trắc 仄 'sharp'	thượng 上 'rising'	âm thượng 陰上	hỏi	rể 'son-in-law; groom'
trắc 仄 'sharp'	thượng 上 'rising'	dương thượng 陽上	ngã	rễ 'root'
trắc 仄 'sharp'	khứ 去 'departing'	âm khứ 陰去	sắc	lá 'leaf'
trắc 仄 'sharp'	khứ 去 'departing'	dương khứ 陽去	nặng	lạ 'strange'
trắc 仄 'sharp'	nhập 入 'entering'	âm nhập 陰入	sắc	mắt 'eye'
trắc 仄 'sharp'	nhập 入 'entering'	dương nhập 陽入	nặng	mặt 'face'

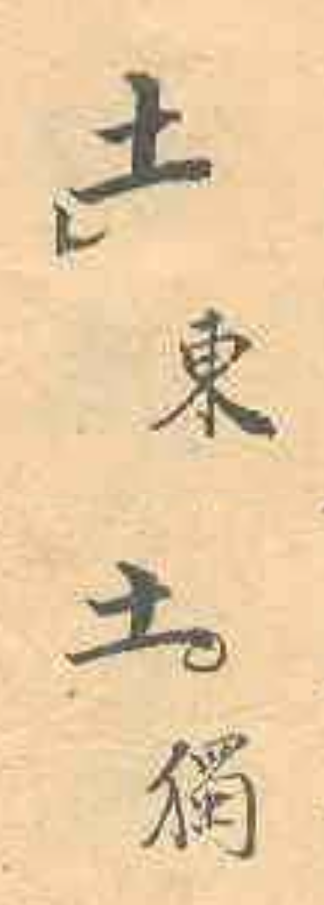
Tonal markers in Quốc âm tân tự 國音新字. Shown here are đông 東 which has the âm bình 陰平 tone and độc 獨 which has the dương nhập 陽入 tone.

Tones of âm 陰 degree are marked with a small semi-circle, and tones of dương 陽 degree are marked with a small circle mark. For example, đông 東 is marked with a small semi-circle on the bottom-left as (1) it is a tone of âm degree which then is marked with a semi-circle (2) it is marked on the bottom left as the bình 平 tone is typically marked at the bottom-left of a character. Another example would be độc 獨 which is marked with a small circle on the bottom-right as (1) it is a tone of dương degree which then is marked with a circle (2) it is marked on the bottom-right as it is a nhập 入 tone.

The four tone classes
꜂上 thượng	去꜄ khứ
꜀平 bình	入꜆ nhập

Quốc âm tân tự can be written vertically or horizontally like chữ Hán and chữ Nôm, and is a set of phonetic scripts created by the Vietnamese themselves (when chữ Nôm is a logographic system created by the Vietnamese, Quốc Ngữ is a phonetic script created by Francisco de Pina). When Quốc âm tân tự was created, it did not gain any widespread usage due to it just being a proposal, and because the political and social situation of Vietnam was too complicated at that time due to the gradual weakening of Nguyễn rule and the beginning of the French invasion.

=== Chữ Quốc ngữ ===
Vietnamese in Latin script, called chữ Quốc ngữ, is the currently used script. It was first developed by Portuguese missionaries in the 17th century, based on the pronunciation of Portuguese language and alphabet. For 200 years, chữ Quốc ngữ was mainly used within the Catholic community. However it was mainly used a tool for missionaries to learn Vietnamese. The main script for Vietnamese Catholic texts was chữ Nôm. During French administration, the alphabet was further modified and then later made a part of compulsory education in 1910.

Meanwhile, the use of chu Hán and chữ Nôm started to decline. At this time there were briefly four competing writing systems in Vietnam; chữ Hán, chữ Nôm, chữ Quốc ngữ, and French. Although Gia Định Báo, the first Vietnamese newspaper in chữ Quốc ngữ, was founded in 1865, Vietnamese nationalists continued to use chữ Nôm until after the First World War.

After French rule, chữ Quốc ngữ became the favored written language of the Vietnamese independence movement.

BBC journalist Nguyễn Giang noted that while the early Christian missionaries are credited with creating the Vietnamese alphabet, what they did was not unique or difficult and would have been done later without them had they not created it. Giang further stated that the main reason for the popularisation of the Latin alphabet in the Nguyễn dynasty (the French protectorates of Annam and Tonkin) was because of the pioneering efforts by intellectuals from French Cochinchina combined with the progressive and scientific policies of the French government in French Indochina, that created the momentum for the usage of chữ Quốc ngữ to spread. Giang stated that the Tonkin Free School only removed the stigma against using chữ Quốc ngữ for the Nguyễn dynasty elites, but did not actually popularise it.

An important reason why Latin script became the standard writing system of Vietnam but not so in Cambodia and Laos -- which were also dominated by the French -- is because Emperors of the Nguyễn dynasty heavily promoted its usage. According to the historian Liam Kelley in his 2016 work "Emperor Thành Thái's Educational Revolution" neither the French nor the revolutionaries had enough power to spread the usage of chữ Quốc ngữ down to the village level. It was by imperial decree in 1906 that the Thành Thái Emperor parents could decide whether their children will follow a curriculum in Hán văn (漢文) or Nam âm (南音, "Southern sound", the contemporary Nguyễn dynasty name for chữ Quốc ngữ). This decree was issued at the same time when other social changes, such as the cutting of long male hair, were occurring.

From the first days it was recognized that the Chinese language was a barrier between us and the natives; the education provided by means of the hieroglyphic characters was completely beyond us; this writing makes possible only with difficulty transmitting to the population the diverse ideas which are necessary for them at the level of their new political and commercial situation. Consequently we are obliged to follow the traditions of our own system of education; it is the only one which can bring close to us the Annamites of the colony by inculcating in them the principles of European civilization and isolating them from the hostile influence of our neighbors.

— In a letter dated January 15, 1866, Paulin Vial, Directeur du Cabinet du Gouverneur de la Cochinchine

As a result of extensive education in chữ Quốc ngữ, Vietnamese people of today who are not versed in Chinese characters or Chinese-origin words are unable to read earlier Vietnamese texts written in Hán-Nôm. The Hán Nôm Institute is the national centre for academic research into Hán-Nôm literature. Although there have been movements to restore Hán-Nôm in Vietnam, via education in schools or usage in everyday life, almost all ancient poems and literary texts have been translated to and converted to chữ Quốc ngữ, which makes the need for literacy in Hán-Nôm almost obsolete. However, many Vietnamese find it difficult to detach themselves from their Hán-Nôm legacy, and may still feel an intimate relationship with Chinese characters.

=== Sanskrit, Cham, Khmer and Indic scripts ===
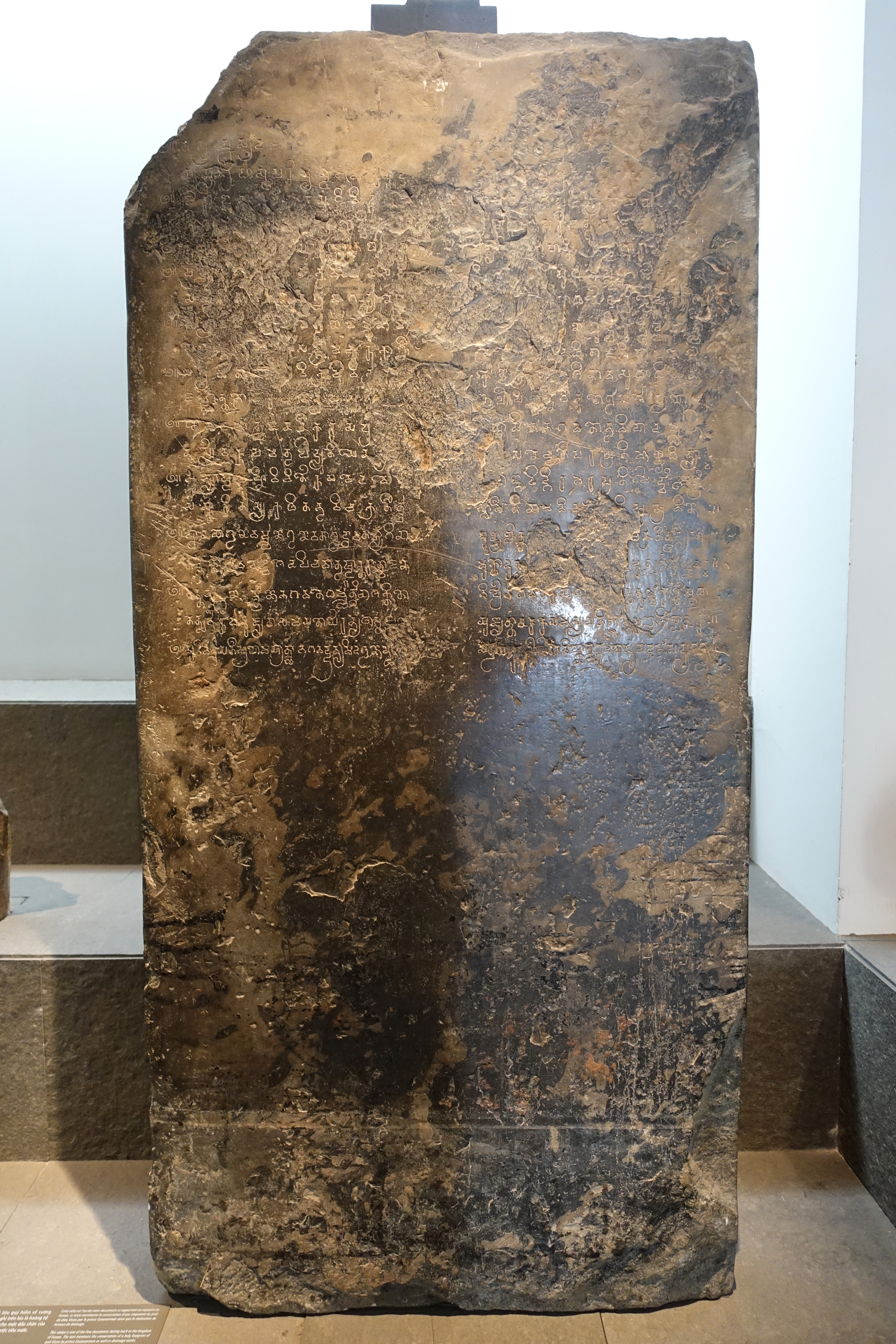
Sanskrit

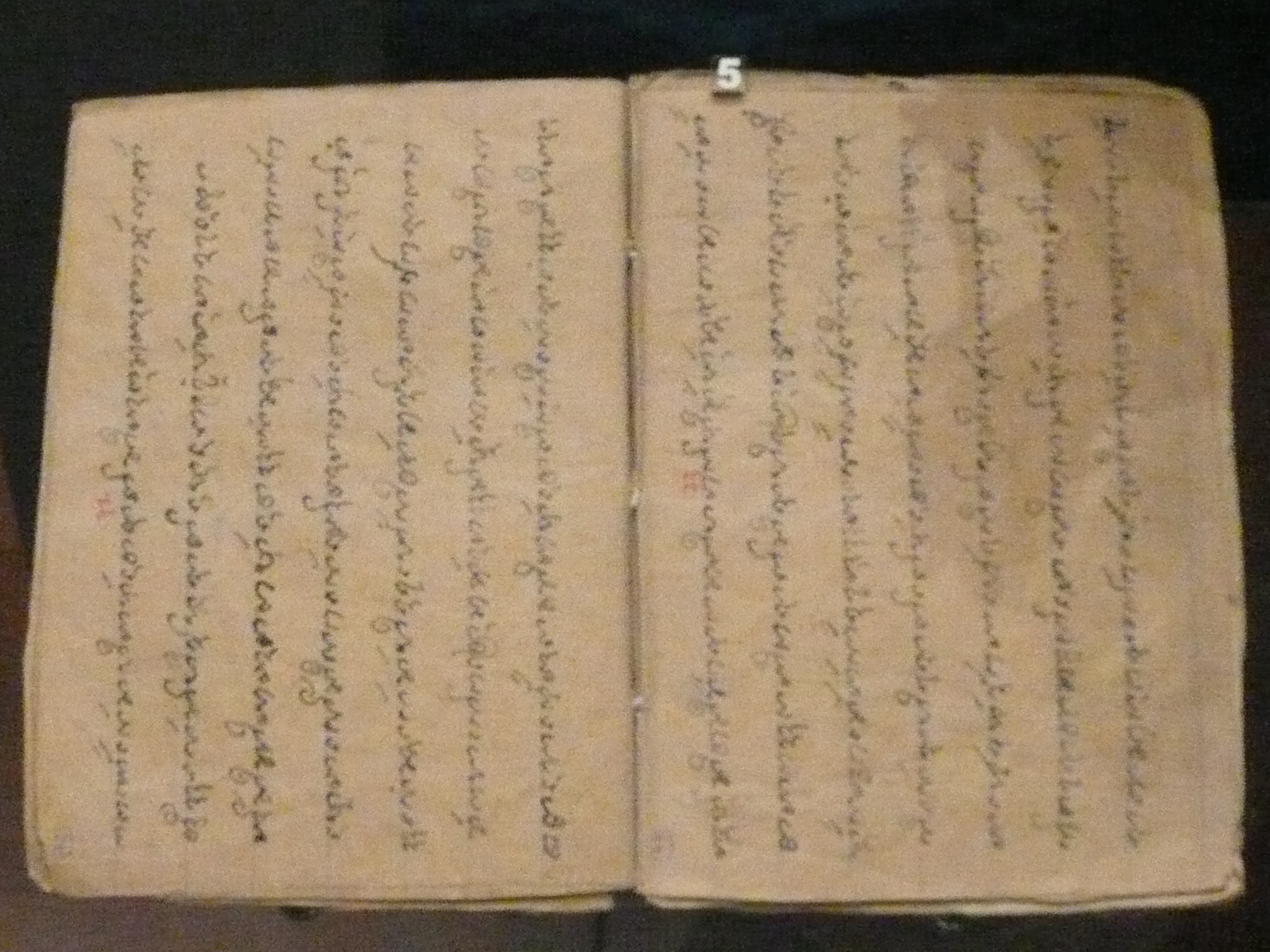
Cham

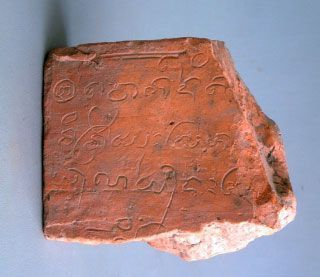
Cham–Vietnamese

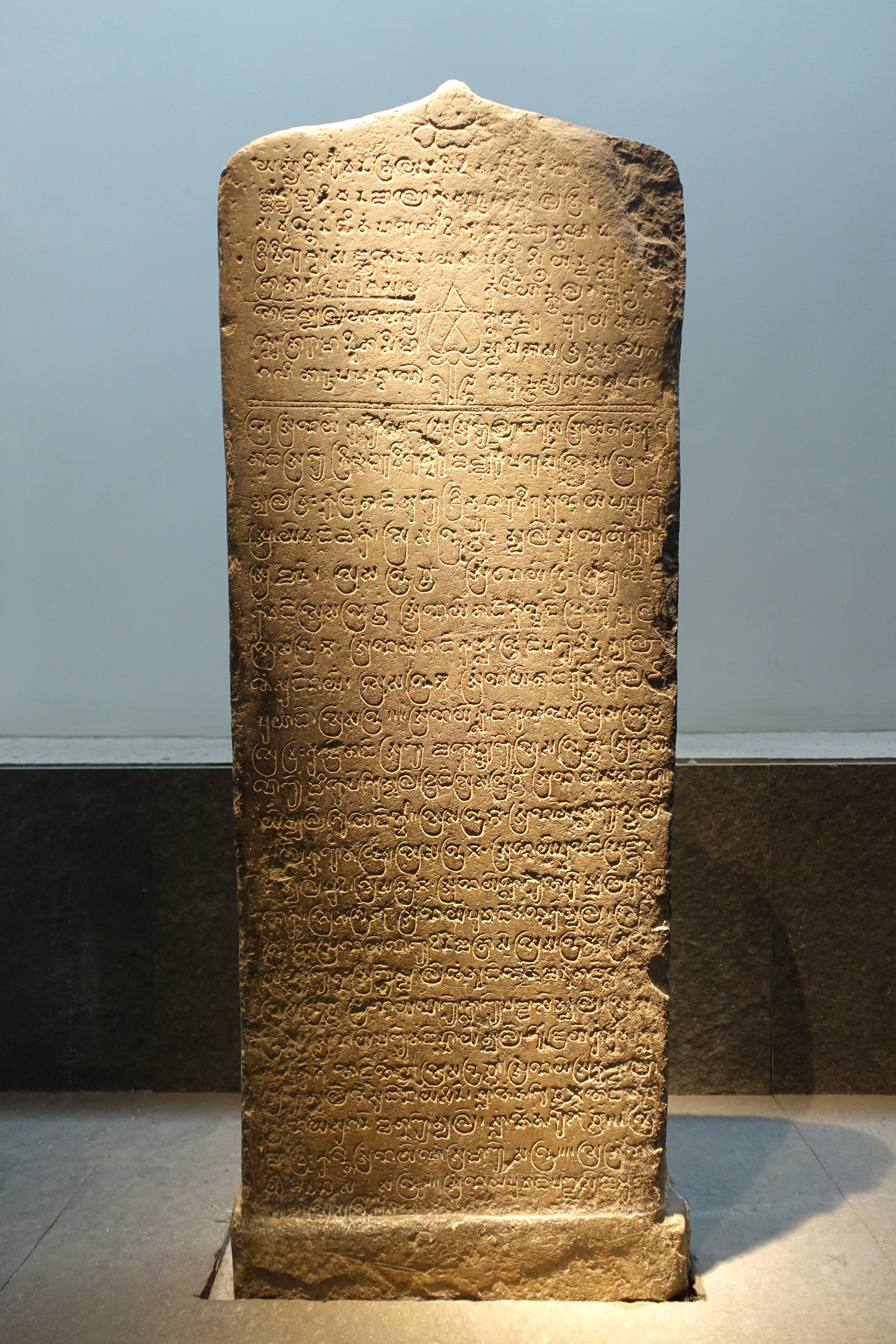
Khmer

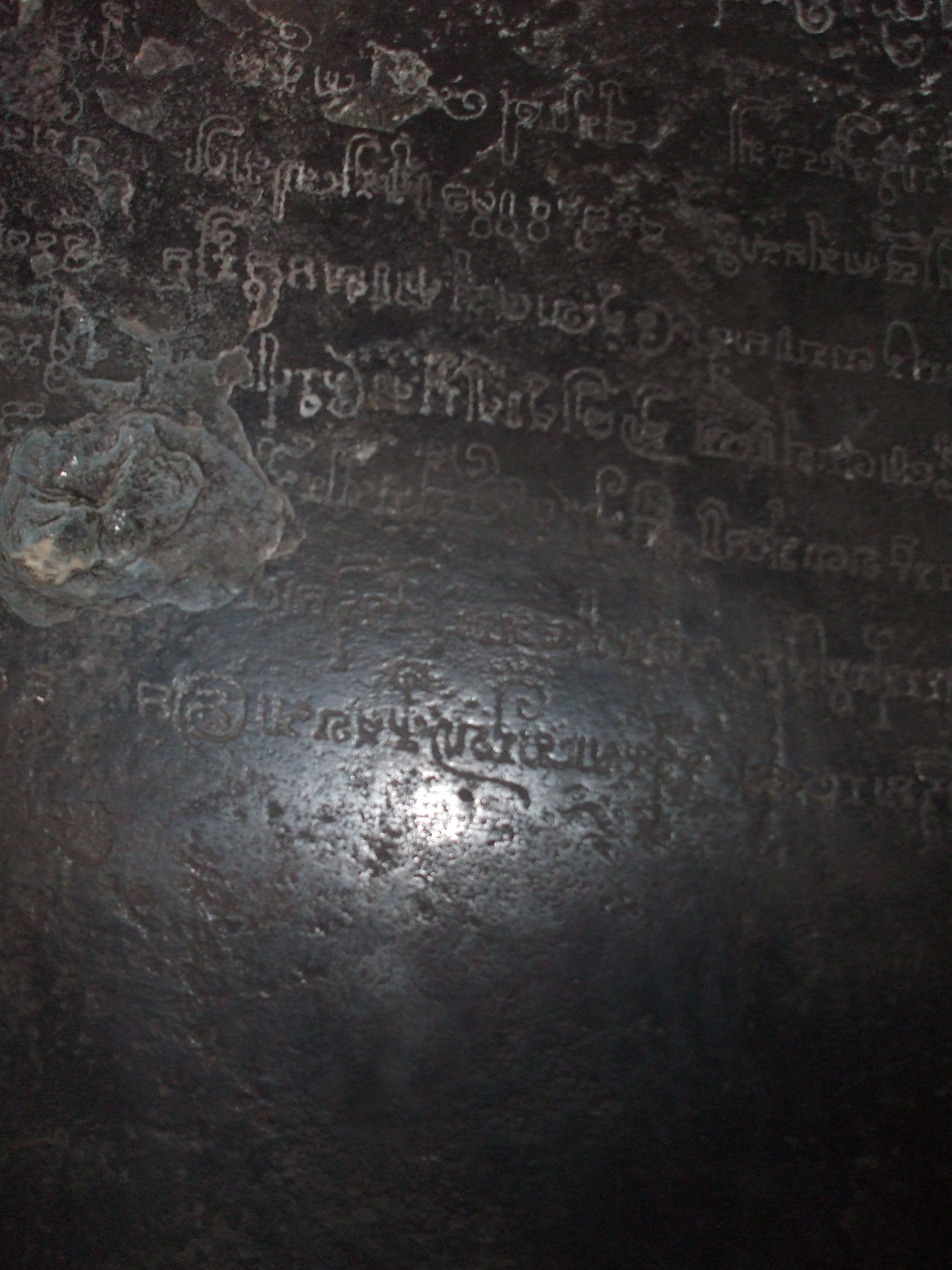
Khmer

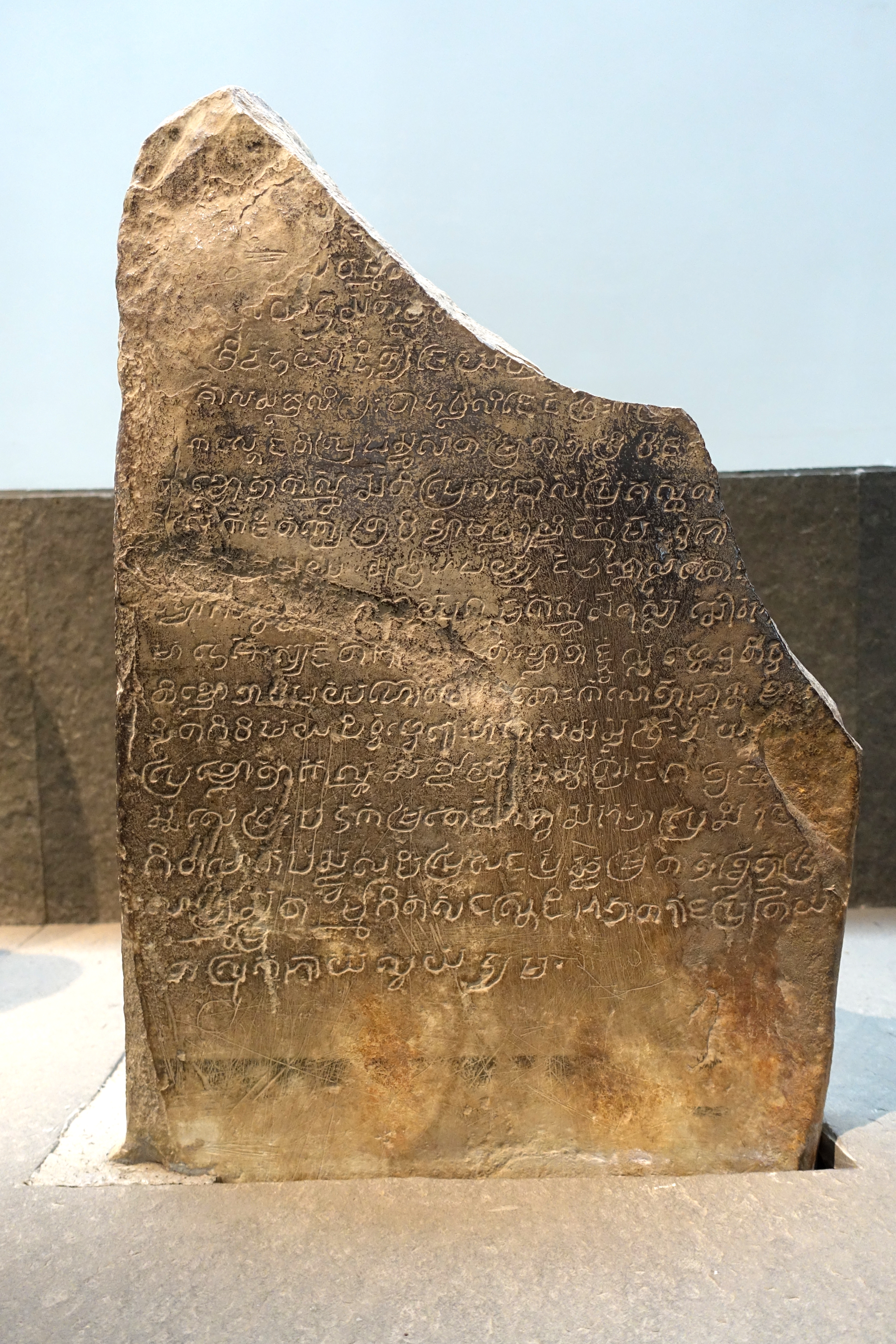
Sanskrit–Khmer

Sanskrit texts have often been passed over and translated to Vietnamese indirectly from Chinese texts via religious teachings from Buddhist sectors, or directly, such as from Champa and Khmer. One of the most significant landmarks still remaining to this day is the ancient Mỹ Sơn Hindu Temple which has Sanskrit and Champa inscriptions. The Võ Cạnh inscription is also the oldest Sanskrit inscription ever found in Southeast Asia, a legacy of Lâm Ấp, Champa, and Funan kingdoms. The most well-known modern Vietnamese phrase with Sanskrit phrase is from common religious Buddhist mantra नमोऽमिताभाय/ Namo Amitābhāya (Nam mô A Di Đà Phật / 南無阿彌陀佛), meaning, "Hail Buddha of Infinite Light" (translated directly from Sanskrit) or "I pay homage to the Enlightened One immeasurable" / "I turn to rely on the Enlightened One immeasurable". Additionally, many sites in Vietnam have names that are Khmer in origin, from when the land was under Funan and Chenla reign, etc. For example, ស្រុកឃ្លាំង Srok Khleang is written as Sóc Trăng in Vietnamese. Hence, there is some Khmer influence in Mekong Delta, Vietnam.

=== Tai Dam script ===
The Tai Viet script is the abugida used by the Tai Dam people and other Southwest Tai-speaking peoples in Northern Vietnam, from 16th century to present-day, derived from the Fakkham script of Tai Lanna people.

=== Jawi script ===
From the onset of the 18th century, Cham communities in the Mekong Delta began adopting the Arabic-derived Jawi script. Today, the Western Cham (Cambodian and Mekong Delta Cham whom majority are Sunni Muslims) use both Jawi and Latin alphabets to write their language, compared to the Eastern Cham who are mostly Bani Muslims and Balamon and still using Akhar Thrah (traditional) script and Latin alphabets.

=== Modern usage of chữ Hán and chữ Nôm ===
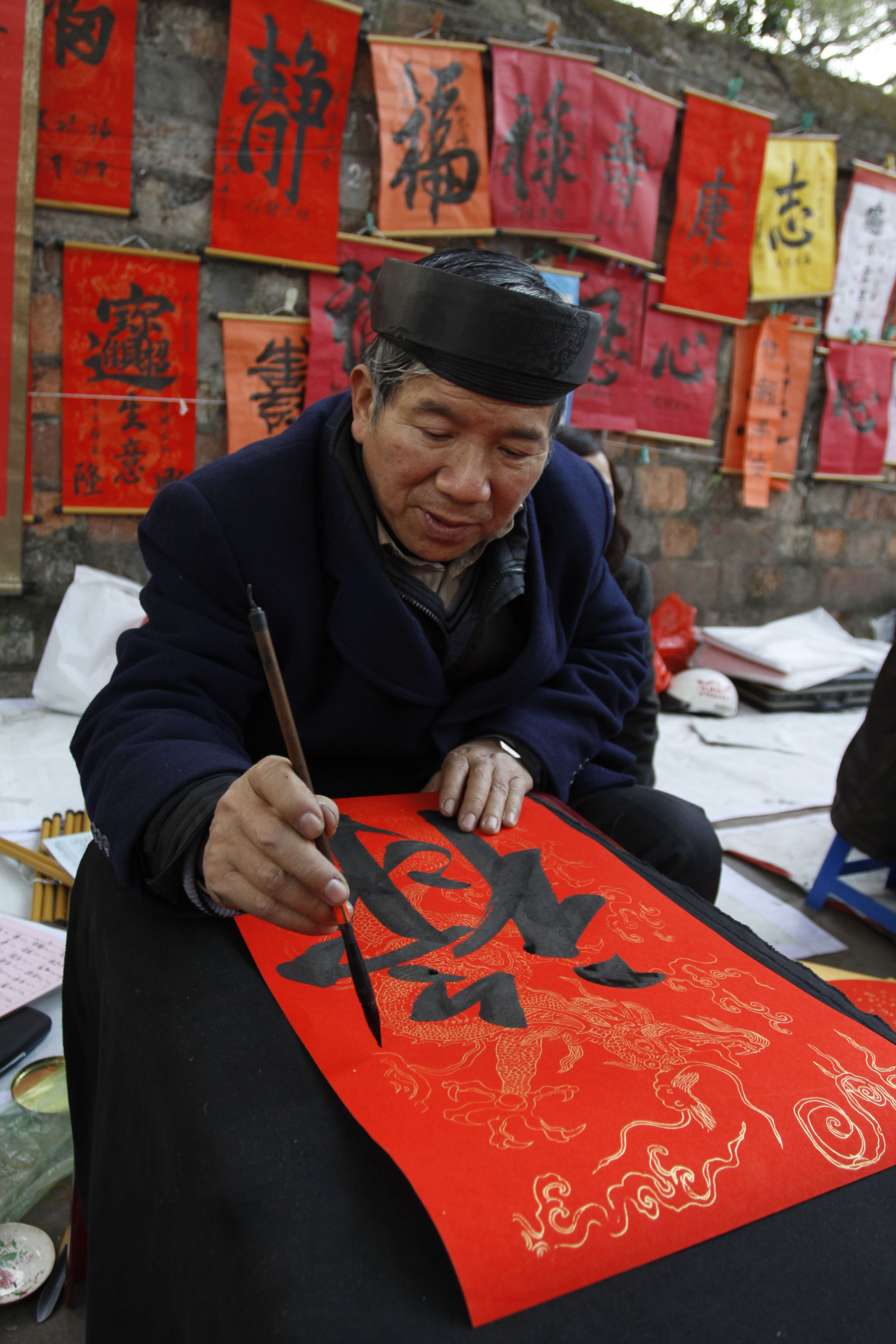
Writing the Chinese character 祿 "good fortune" (Sino-Vietnamese reading: lộc) in preparation for Tết, at the Temple of Literature, Hanoi (2011)

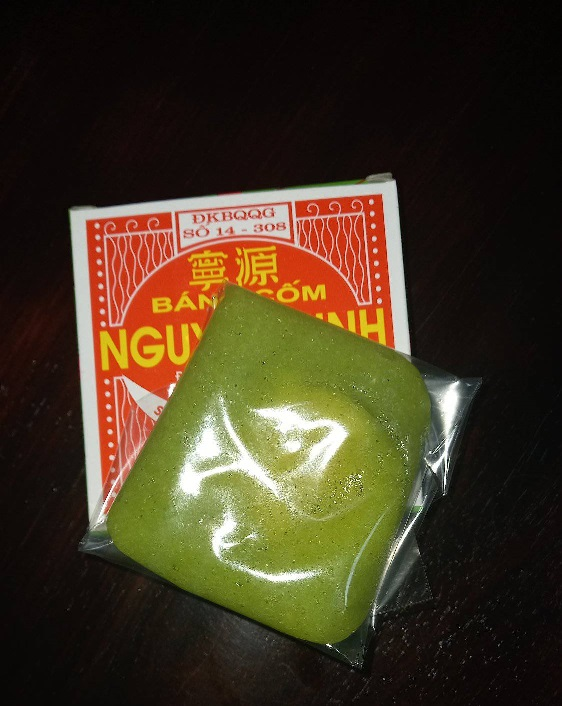
Chữ Hán on the packaging of a brand that produces Bánh cốm

Individual chữ Hán are still written by calligraphers for special occasions such as the Vietnamese New Year, Tết. They are still present outside Buddhist temples and are still studied for scholarly and religious purposes.

Vietnamese calligraphy (Thư pháp chữ Việt) has enjoyed tremendous success at the expense of chữ Hán calligraphy since its introduction in the 1950s.

Since the mid-1990s there has been a noticeable resurgence in the teaching of Chinese characters, both for chữ Hán and the additional characters used in chữ Nôm. This is to enable the study of Vietnam's long history as well as cultural synthesis and unification.

For linguists, the Sino-Vietnamese readings of Chinese characters provide data for the study of historical Chinese phonology and reconstruction of the Old Chinese language.

Additionally, many Vietnamese may study Chinese characters as part of learning Chinese, Japanese, or Korean (since Japanese and Korean have a high concentration of Chinese-cognate words). In the process, they also end up with some measure of fluency with Hán–Nôm characters.

The significance of chữ Hán and chữ Nôm has occasionally entered Western depiction of Vietnam, especially since French rule. Novelist E. M. Nathanson, for example, mentions chu Hán in A Dirty Distant War (1987).

==== Mixed script ====
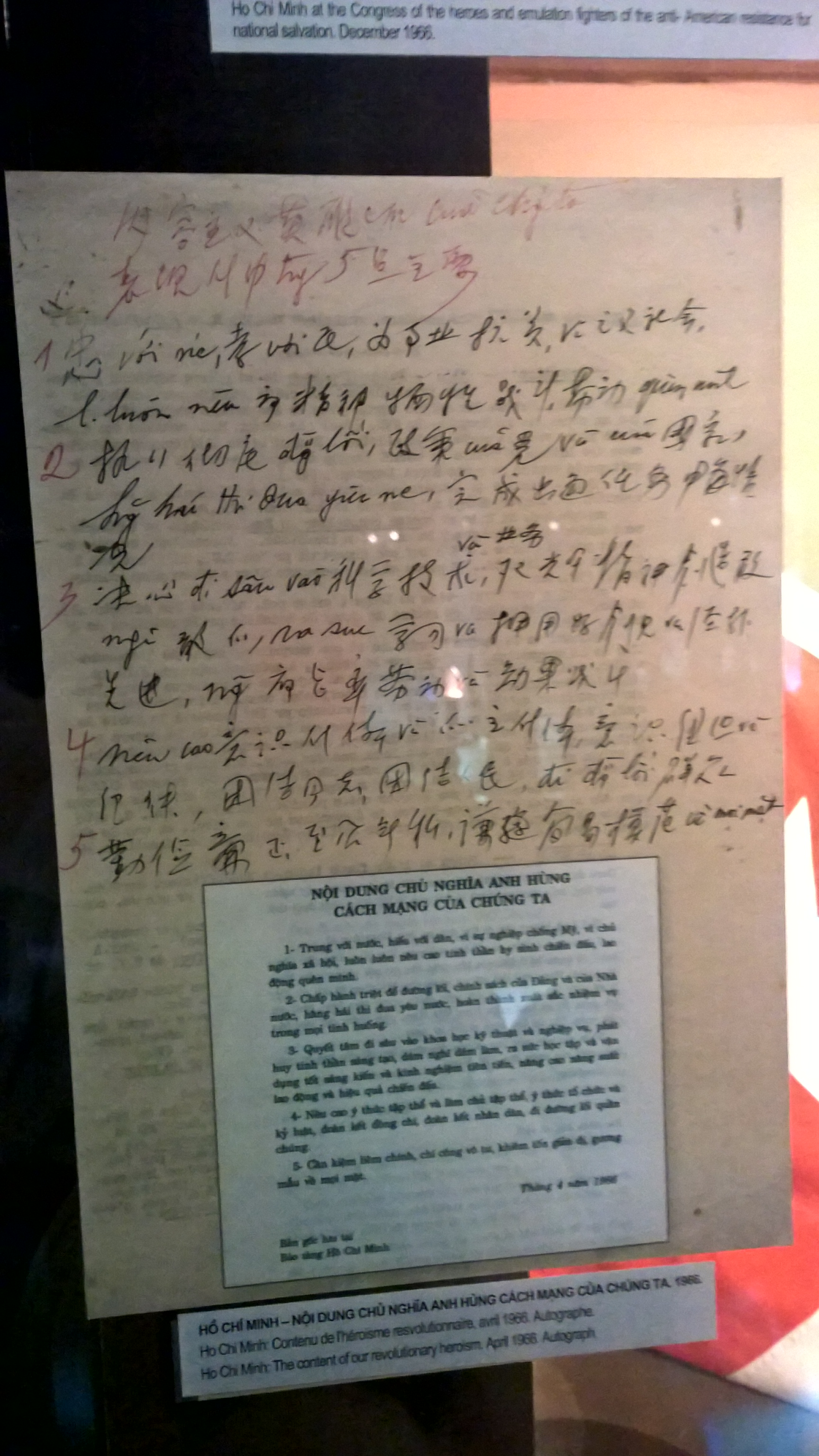
Vietnamese Mixed Script in the Ho Chi Minh Museum in 2016

It is known that Ho Chi Minh wrote in a mixed Vietnamese Latin–Hán-Nôm script.

== See also ==
- Portuguese Alphabet (the Vietnamese alphabet was largely based on the conventions of the Romance languages)
- Vietnamese numerals (contains a numeral table with corresponding Hán-Nôm characters, Sino-Vietnamese words, and Native Vietnamese words)

== Works cited ==
- DeFrancis, John (1977), Colonialism and language policy in Viet Nam, Mouton, ISBN 978-90-279-7643-7.
- Denecke, Wiebke (2017), "Shared Literary Heritage", in Li, Wai-yee; Denecke, Wiebke; Tian, Xiaofen (eds.), The Oxford Handbook of Classical Chinese Literature (1000 BCE-900 CE), Oxford: Oxford University Press, pp. 510–532, ISBN 978-0-199-35659-1
- Hannas, Wm. C. (1997), Asia's Orthographic Dilemma, Honolulu: University of Hawai'i Press, p. 82, ISBN 9780824818920
- Kornicki, Peter (2017), "Sino-Vietnamese literature", in Li, Wai-yee; Denecke, Wiebke; Tian, Xiaofen (eds.), The Oxford Handbook of Classical Chinese Literature (1000 BCE-900 CE), Oxford: Oxford University Press, pp. 568–578, ISBN 978-0-199-35659-1
- Li, Yu (2020). The Chinese Writing System in Asia: An Interdisciplinary Perspective. Routledge. ISBN 978-1-00-069906-7.

== Relevant literature ==
- Chiung, Wi-vun Taiffalo. 2003. Learning efficiencies for different orthographies: a comparative study of Han characters and Vietnamese romanization. University of Texas at Arlington: doctoral dissertation.
