= Pseudo-Chinese =

Japanese internet slang using only kanji

Chinese name
- Traditional Chinese: 偽中國語
- Simplified Chinese: 伪中国语
Transcriptions
Standard Mandarin
- Hanyu Pinyin: wěi Zhōngguóyǔ
- Bopomofo: ㄨㄟˇㄓㄨㄥ ㄍㄨㄛˊㄩˇ
- Gwoyeu Romatzyh: Woei Jonggwoyeu
- Tongyong Pinyin: wěi jhong guó yǔ
- IPA: [wèɪ ʈʂʊ́ŋkwǒỳ]
Wu
- Romanization: hhue tson koq nyy
Hakka
- Pha̍k-fa-sṳ: ngúi Chûng-koet-ngî
Yue: Cantonese
- Yale Romanization: ngaih jūng gwok yúh
- Jyutping: ngai6 zung1 gwok3 jyu5
- Canton Romanization: ngei6 zung1 guog3 yu5
- IPA: [ŋɐi̯˨ t͡sʊŋ˥ kʷɔːk̚˧ jyː˩˧]
Southern Min
- Hokkien POJ: Gūi Tiong-kok-gú
Eastern Min
- Fuzhou BUC: Ngôi Dṳ̆ng-guók-ngṳ̄

Japanese name
- Hiragana: にせちゅうごくご
- Katakana: ニセチュウゴクゴ
- Kyūjitai: 僞中國語
- Shinjitai: 偽中国語
Transcriptions
- Romanization: Nise Chūgokugo

Pseudo-Chinese (Japanese: 偽中国語, Hepburn: nise chūgokugo; pinyin: wěi Zhōngguóyǔ) is a form of Japanese Internet slang which first appeared around 2009.

== Features ==
Pseudo-Chinese involves taking sentences which are grammatically Japanese and stripping away the hiragana and katakana, leaving only the kanji behind. This causes the resultant sentence to appear Chinese.

This style of writing can lead to idiosyncratic word choices. For example, 非常感謝 (much appreciated) may be rendered as 大変感謝; while 感謝 (gratitude) is common to both languages, 非常 is used as an intensifier in Chinese whereas 大変 serves the same purpose in Japanese. Commentators on Baidu have noticed the similarity between pseudo-Chinese and Classical Chinese, with such expressions as 貴方明日何処行？(lit. Where will you go tomorrow?).

The phenomenon has received attention in China and elsewhere, where Chinese speakers can often guess the meaning of the sentences despite not knowing Japanese. Taiwan's Central News Agency has hailed pseudo-Chinese as a new platform for Sino-Japanese communication.

== See also ==
- Faux Cyrillic
- Kyowa-go
- Kanbun
- Wasei-kango
- Brushtalk
