= De Forçant =

French naval officer

De Forçant (also spelled de Forsans or de Forçanz; died 1809) full name Godefroy de Forçanz, was a French Navy officer and an adventurer who went into the service of Nguyễn Ánh, the future emperor Gia Long of Nguyễn dynasty, Vietnam.

De Forçant was the commander of French warship l'Aigle. In 1788, he came to Vietnam together with Jean-Baptiste Chaigneau, Philippe Vannier and Jean-Marie Dayot following the encouragements of Mgr Pigneau de Béhaine, and swore allegiance to Nguyễn Ánh (later Emperor Gia Long). He received the title of trưởng cơ (掌奇), together with Chaigneau, Vannier and Despiau, meaning second-class second-degree military mandarins, and took the Vietnamese name Lê Văn Lăng (黎文棱).

De Forçant participated in the battle of Thị Nại in March 1801 together with Chaigneau and Vannier, under the command of Nguyễn Văn Trương. He died in Cochinchina in 1809.

== See also ==
- French assistance to Nguyễn Ánh
- France-Vietnam relations
