= Phan Thanh Giản =

Vietnamese official (1796–1867)

Phan Thanh Giản 潘清簡
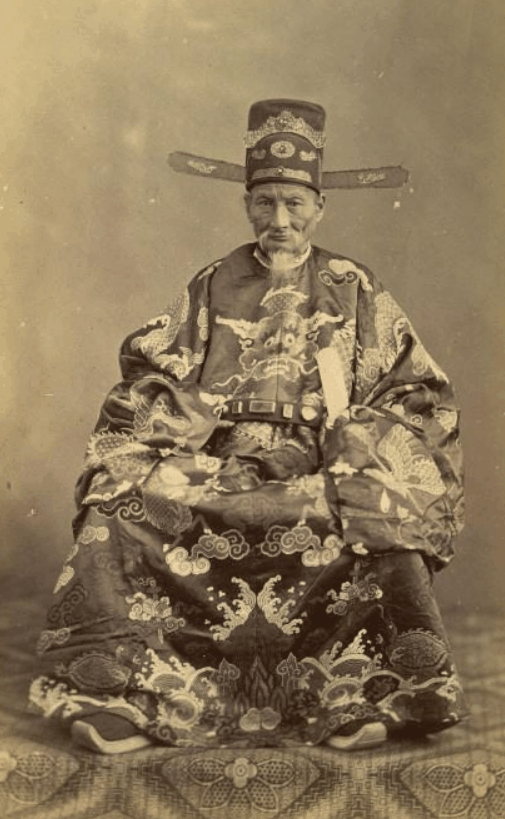
- Phan Thanh Giản in Paris, 1863.
- Born: 11 November 1796; Ba Thanh village, Biên Hòa
- Died: 4 August 1867 (aged 70); Cochinchina
- Other names: Courtesy name (tự): Đạm Như (淡如); Pseudonym (hiệu): Lương Khê (梁溪).
- Organization: Nguyễn dynasty

Notes
- Negotiator of the Treaty of Saigon. Ambassador to France. Governor.

Phan Thanh Giản (11 November 1796– 4 August 1867) was a Grand Counsellor at the Nguyễn court in Vietnam. He led a diplomatic mission to France in 1863, and committed suicide when France completed the invasion of Southern Vietnam (Cochinchine) in 1867.

== Life ==
=== Treaty of Saigon ===
Phan Thanh Giản was one of the foremost mandarins of the Nguyễn court. He played a key role in negotiating the Treaty of Saigon with the French in 1862. The negotiations led to the formal cession of Vietnamese territory that the French Expeditionary Corps had occupied in 1861 (the first parts of the future colony of Cochinchina): the provinces of Gia Định, Định Tường, Biên Hòa, and the Poulo Condore islands were ceded, and war reparations paid to the French.

Because of his role in these negotiations, Phan Thanh Giản became rather unpopular, both with the Vietnamese population, and with the court of emperor Tự Đức.

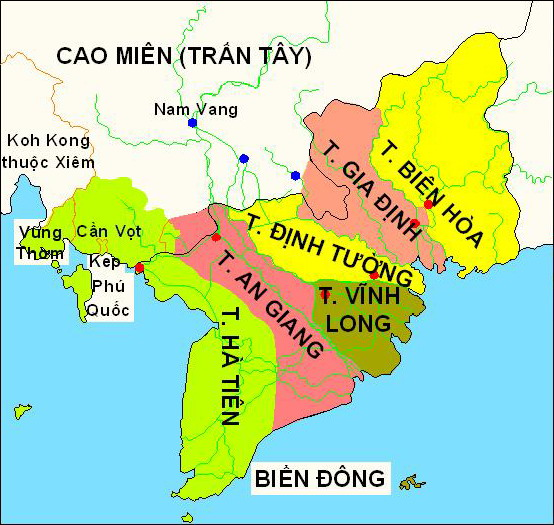
Six Provinces of Southern Vietnam before French colonization.

=== Embassy to France (1863) ===
In 1863, Phan Thanh Giản was sent by the emperor on an mission to France to visit Napoleon III, in order to negotiate the return of the territories seded to the French. Phan Thanh Giản was accompanied by Michel Duc Chaigneau (the son of Jean-Baptiste Chaigneau) on this voyage. Phan Thanh Giản was with a 70-strong company that met with Napoleon III and Empress Eugénie in November 1863. Napoleon III, moved by Phan Thanh Giản's plea, accepted to return the provinces in exchange for a war indemnity, an agreement to station troops in Saigon, My Tho and Thủ Dầu Một, and recognition of French military protection. The French Navy Minister Chasseloup-Laubat however, opposed to the return of Cochinchinese territory, threatened Napoleon III with his resignation and that of the whole cabinet, forcing him to order the cancellation of the agreement in June 1864.

Through his visit to France, Phan Thanh Giản obtained a first hand understanding of the level of advancement of France compared to Vietnam, was astonished at examples of technological innovation such as steam trains, and stated on his return to Vietnam that France's "wealth and strength are beyond description". Tự Đức only responded to this warning with admonitions of moral rectitude:

"If faithfulness and sincerity are expressed
Fierce tigers pass by,
Terrifying crocodiles swim away
Everyone listens to Nghia (conscience)"

=== Governorship ===
Upon his return, Tự Đức nominated Phan Thanh Giản governor of the remaining southern provinces. When France invaded the rest of the southern territories in 1867, Phan Thanh Giản chose to avoid armed resistance and failed to defend the citadel of Vĩnh Long, waiting for orders that never came, resigned from his position and took his own life through poisoning.

== Family ==
His grandfather, Phan Thanh Tap was a native of Haicheng (near modern-day Longhai, Fujian) in Zhangzhou prefecture of Fujian province before later ultimately migrating to Vietnam due to political sentiments against the ruling Qing government. Phan Thanh Tap migrated to Vietnam in the early 18th century, along with his family and relatives and settled in the village of Hoi Trung at Bình Định Province. Upon settling in Vietnam, he married a Vietnamese woman, Huynh Thi Ngoc, with whom his Phan's father, Thanh Ngạn was born from this union. Phan Thanh Ngạn began his career as a clerk to the Nguyễn court. In 1798, Phan Thanh Ngạn was appointed as the chief supplier for Lord Ánh's (Emperor Gia Long from 1802) navy and was sent on a diplomatic mission to Tourane, but was later shipwrecked at lost at sea.

He had three sons, Phan Hương, Phan Liêm (also known as Phan Thanh Liêm, or Phan Thanh Tòng), and Phan Tôn, of which the last two organised an armed rebellion against the French soldiers who had colonised Vĩnh Long and were later defeated. Phan Hương stayed in Vĩnh Long, lived hidden as a farmer. Phan Liêm and Phan Tôn escaped to Huế, then followed Nguyễn Tri Phương in Battle of Hanoi (1873). They were defeated and captured by the French force in this one-day battle. General Phương was heavily wounded but refused to be treated by French and began a hunger strike, dying shortly afterwards. Meanwhile, Phan Liêm and Phan Tôn were sent to France.

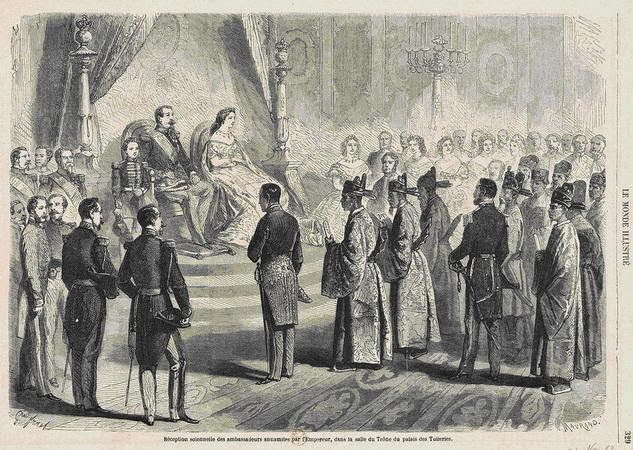
Phan Thanh Giản as the head Vietnamese delegation (middle and first row) to Napoleon III (1863)

== In popular culture ==
Nowadays, Phan Thanh Giản is being venerated as a minor god in some localities in southern Vietnam.

== Images ==
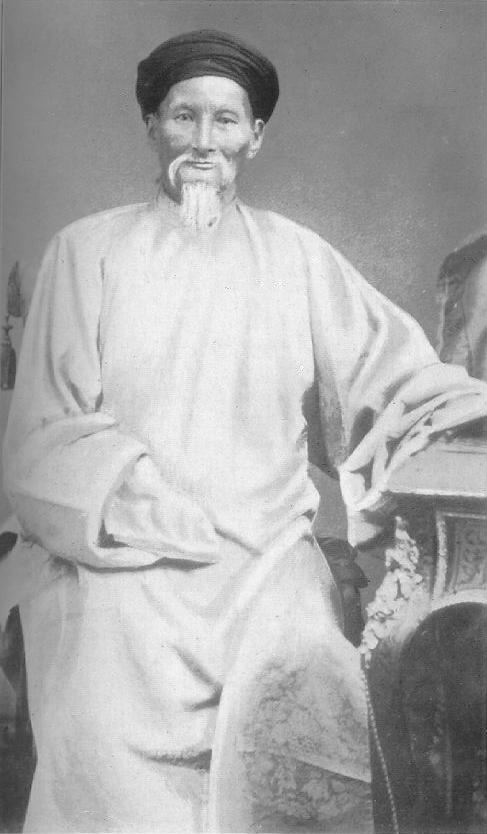
Phan Thanh Giản

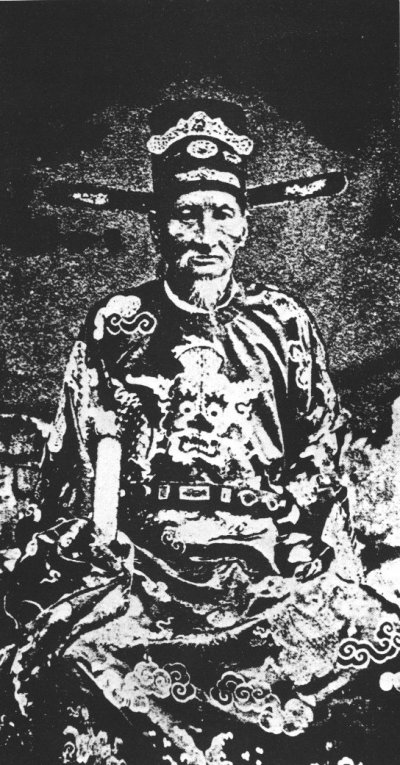
Phan Thanh Giản

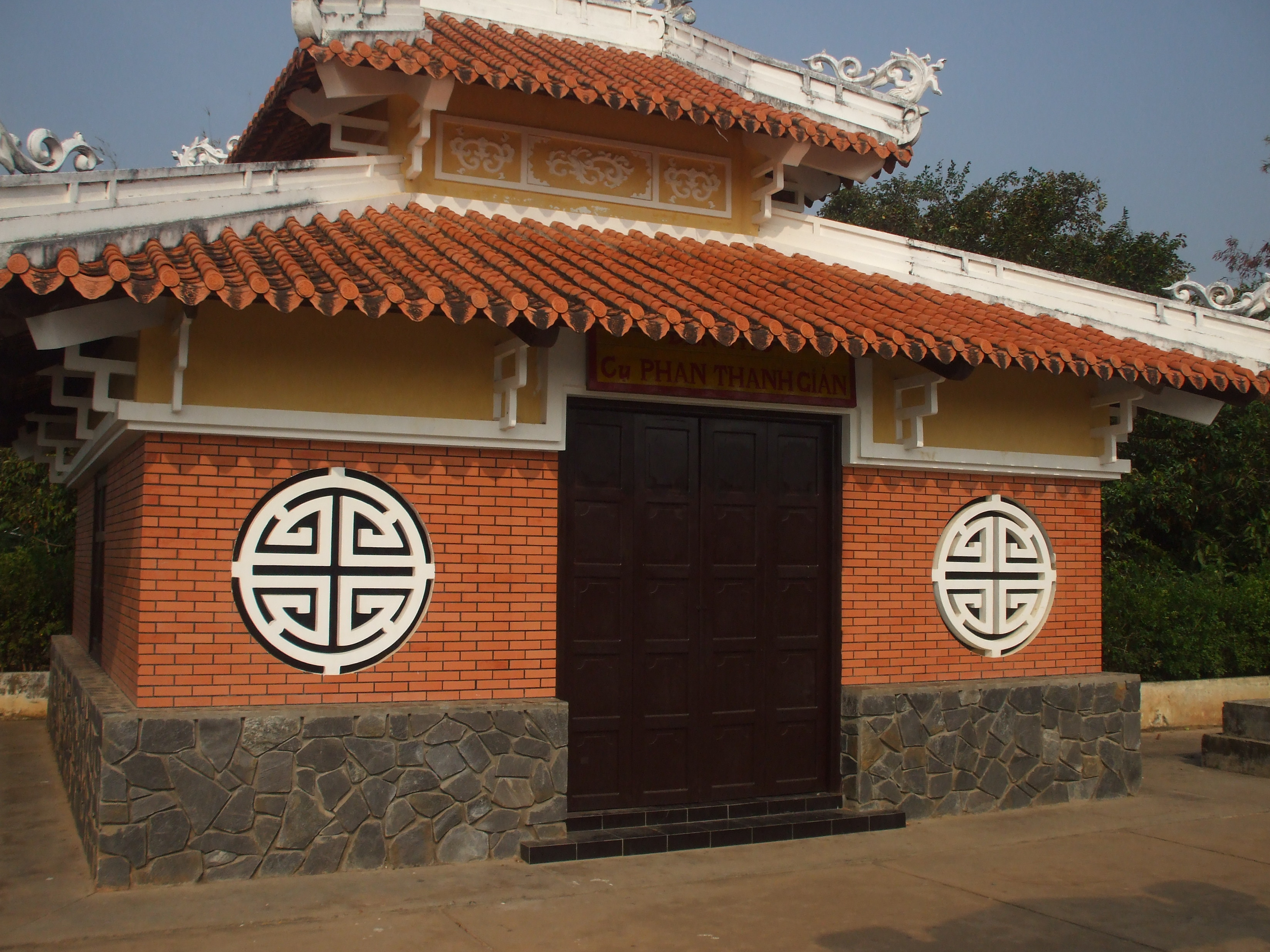
Temple of Phan Thanh Giản at Bao Thanh

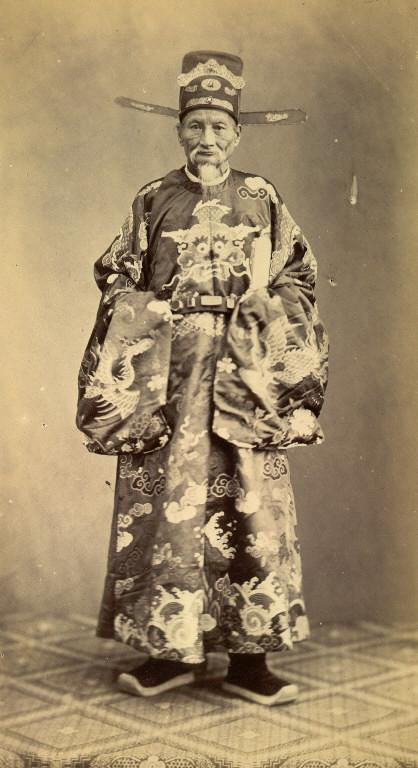
Phan Thanh Giản in Paris, France 1863.

== See also ==
- France–Vietnam relations
- Trương Vĩnh Ký
