= France–Vietnam relations =

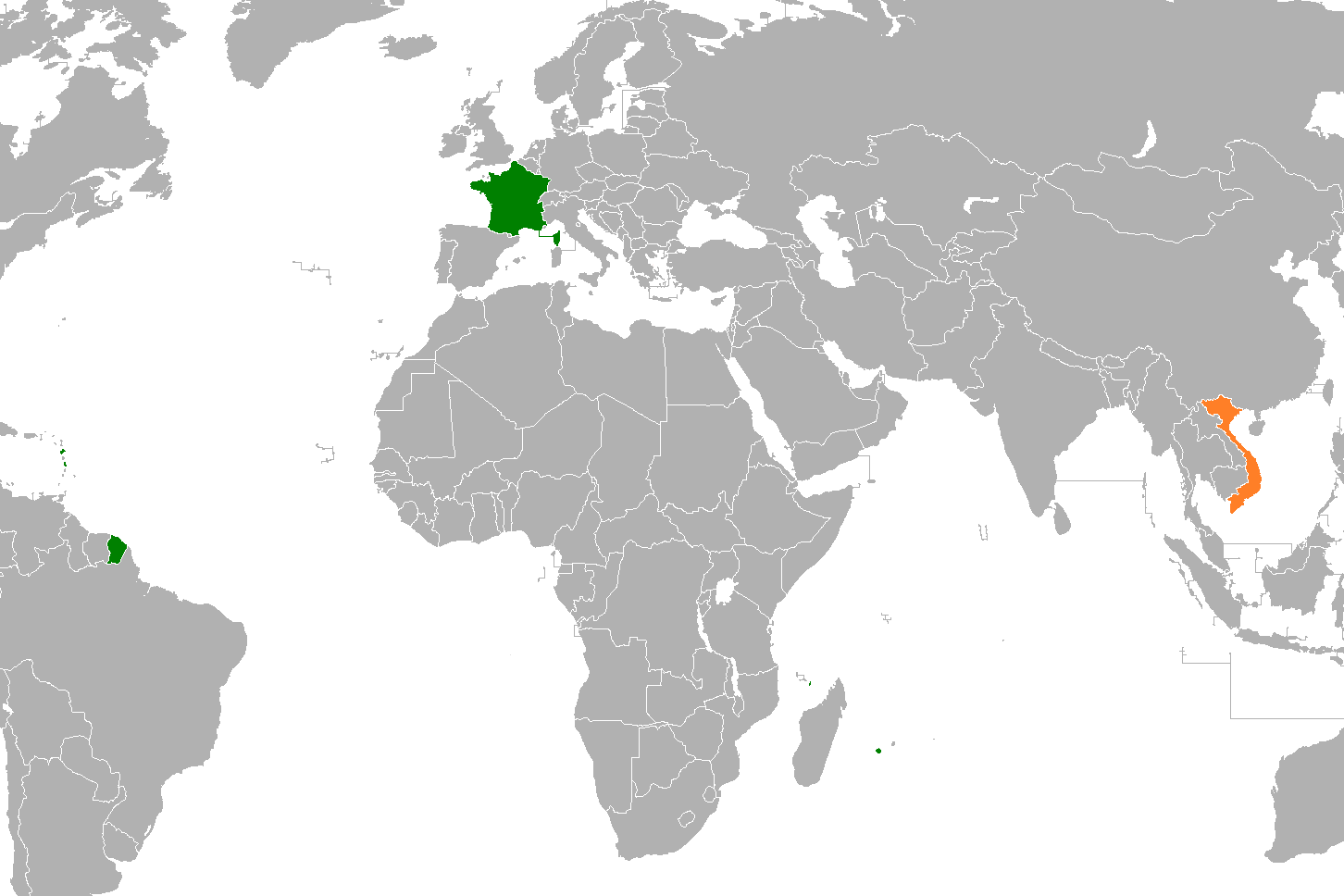
- France: Vietnam

Diplomatic mission
- French Embassy, Hanoi: Vietnamese Embassy, Paris

France–Vietnam relations (French: Relations franco-vietnamiennes; Vietnamese: quan hệ Pháp-Việt) are the diplomatic and historical relations between the French Fifth Republic and the Socialist Republic of Vietnam. These relations began in the 17th century with Catholic missions and various traders until the major involvement of French forces under Pierre Pigneau de Béhaine from 1787 to 1789 helped establish the Nguyễn dynasty. France was heavily involved in Vietnam in the 19th century under the pretext of protecting Catholic missions and ensuring trading privileges in the country. In practice, however, colonial officials in French Indochina were strongly secularist.

== Early contacts ==
French–Vietnamese contacts can be traced to 1658, when the first French missionaries, Joseph Francis Tissanier and Pierre Jacques Albier, S.J., under the Portuguese Padroado, arrived in Vietnam.

One of the early missionaries in Vietnam was the Jesuit priest Alexandre de Rhodes, who arrived in 1624. He was from Avignon (then part of the Papal States, now in France); his mother tongue was Provençal, and he wrote French poorly.

Alexandre de Rhodes returned to Europe in 1650, to advocate the dispatch of bishops in order to better accompany the development of Roman Catholicism in Vietnam (at that time around 100,000 converts), and the dispatch of bishops in order to create a strong native clergy and, to avoid in Vietnam a catastrophic eradication of Christianity, as seen in the case of Christianity in Japan around 1620:

"We have all reason to fear that what happened to the Church of Japan could also happen to the Church of Annam, because these kings, in Tonkin as well as in Cochinchina, are very powerful and accustomed to war... It is necessary that the Holy See, by its own movement, give pastors to these Oriental regions where Christians multiply in a marvelous way, lest, without bishops, these men die without sacrament and manifestly risk damnation."

— Alexandre de Rhodes.

The efforts of Alexandre de Rhodes helped to the creation of the Paris Foreign Missions Society (MEP), marking the involvement of Catholic France as a new missionary power in Asia. From 1662, a base was established in Ayutthaya, Siam, by Mgr Lambert de la Motte and Mgr Pallu, from where numerous attempts were made to send missionaries to Vietnam.

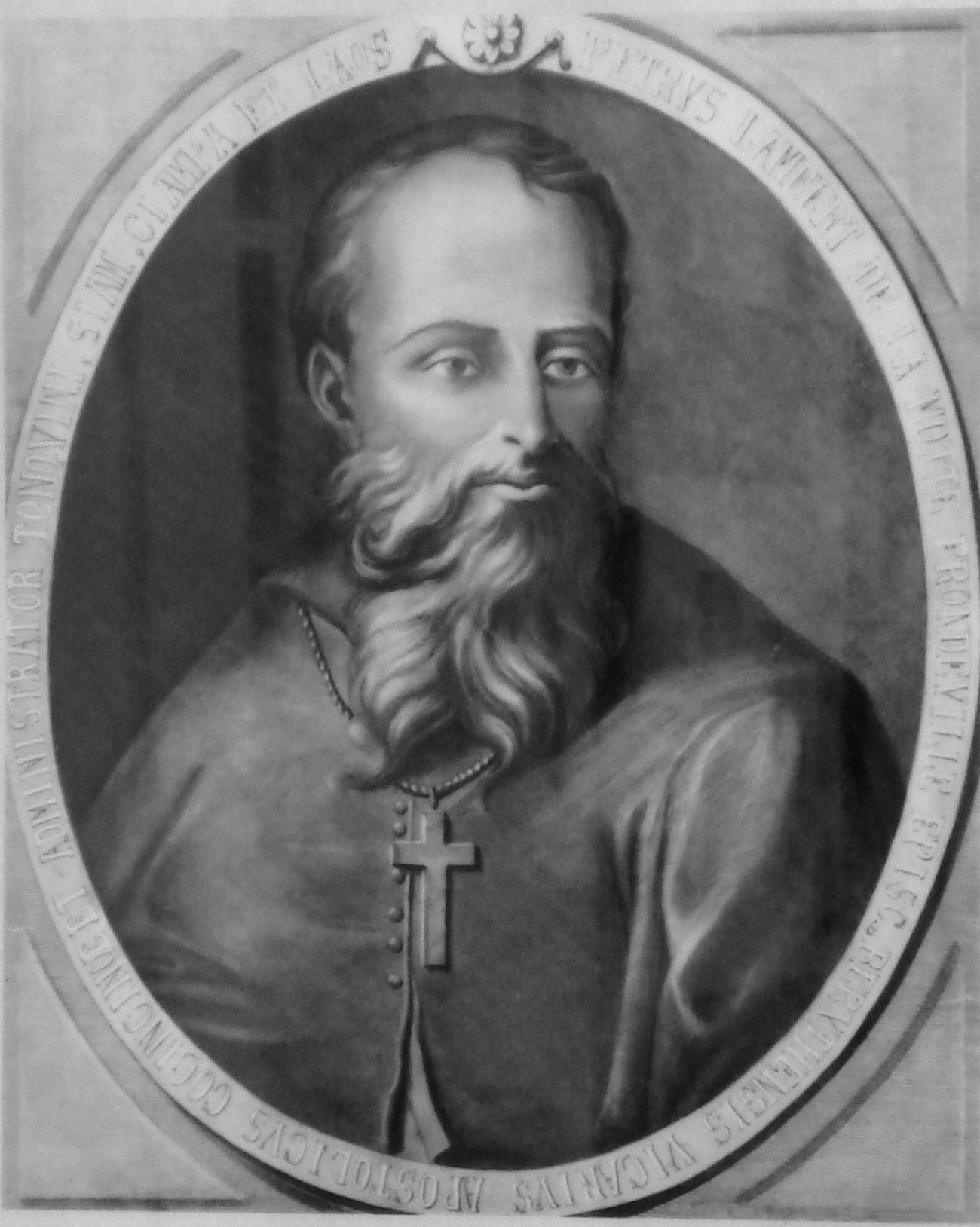
Pierre Lambert de la Motte.

Meanwhile, the Jesuits under the Portuguese Padroado continued their efforts in Vietnam. In 1658, Fathers Manoel Ferreira and Frenchman Joseph Tissanier arrived in Tonkin, but they were expelled in 1664 under the rule of Trịnh Tạc, and fled to Ayutthaya. In June 1666, the Ayutthaya base of the Paris Foreign Missions Society dispatched Father François Deydier to Tonkin, who was able to reorganize Catholics there, although he remained in hiding. Mgr Lambert de la Motte himself would also visit the mission in Tonkin in 1669 and reinforce the organization there, under cover of trading activities of the French East India Company.

In 1680, the French East India Company opened a factory in Phố Hiến. The famous Frenchman Pierre Poivre visited Vietnam from 1720. Missionaries of various nationalities, including Portuguese, Italian/Papal, French, and Spanish, working in Vietnam during the 17th and 18th centuries belonged to the Jesuit Order, the MEP, the Dominican Order, the Discalced Augustinian Order, the Franciscan Order, or were sent directly by the Congregation for the Propagation of the Faith. By the end of the 18th century, Catholicism had become a firmly established part of Vietnam's spiritual and social landscape, particularly in Đàng Ngoài.

== Military collaboration (1787–1820) ==
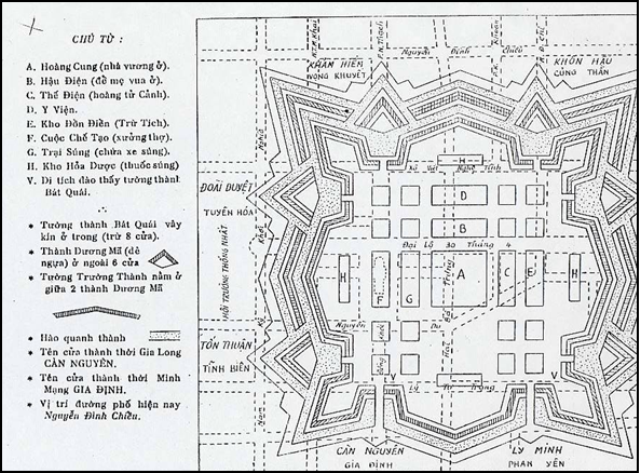
The Citadel of Saigon was built by Olivier de Puymanel for Nguyễn Phúc Ánh according to the designs of Vauban in 1790.

Towards the end of the 18th century, the Tây Sơn rebellion overthrew the Nguyễn family, but one of its members Nguyễn Ánh, future Emperor Gia Long, with the aid of the French Catholic priest Pierre Pigneau de Béhaine, titular bishop of Adran, obtained a treaty of alliance with the French king Louis XVI: the Treaty of Versailles, signed on November 21, 1787. In return Gia Long promised to cede Pulo-Condore to the French and to give a concession to the French in Tourane (modern Da Nang), as well as exclusive trading rights. That treaty marks the beginning of French influence in Indochina, but the Governor in Pondicherry, Count de Conway, refused to follow through with the implementation of the treaty, leaving Béhaine to his own means.

In spite of these inconveniences, between 1789 and 1799, a French force mustered by Béhaine managed to support Gia Long in acquiring sway over the whole of Vietnam. The French trained Vietnamese troops, established a navy, and built fortifications in the Vauban style, such as the Citadel of Saigon or the Citadel of Duyên Khanh. Several of these French adventurers would remain in high positions in the government of Gia Long such as Philippe Vannier, Jean-Baptiste Chaigneau, de Forsans and the doctor Despiau.

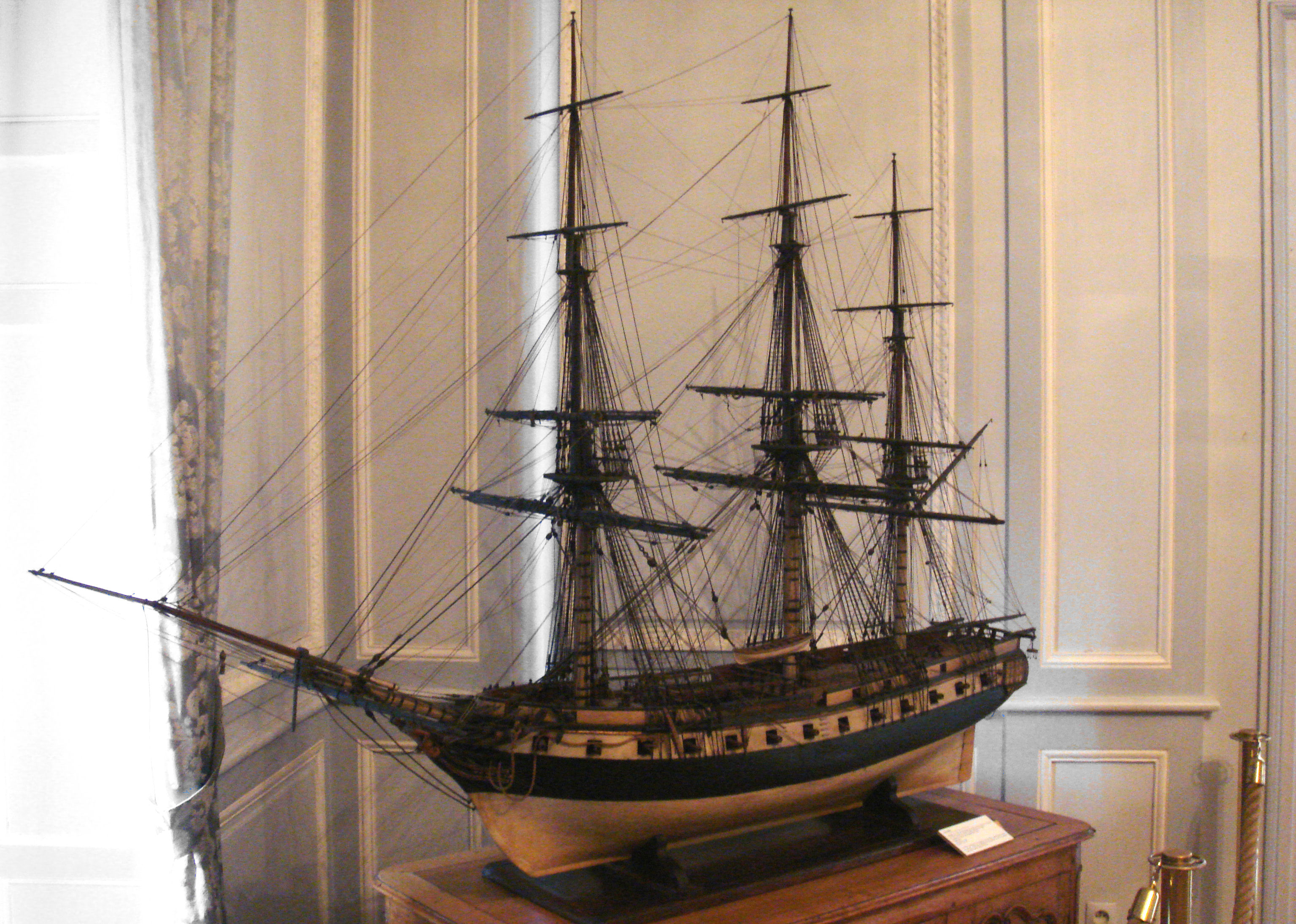
Frigate Thétis, 1813 model. Musée National de la Marine (Rochefort).

The death of Gia Long, and the accession of Emperor Minh Mạng in 1820 severely strained relations between France and Vietnam. In an effort to reestablish close contacts, Jean-Baptiste Chaigneau was nominated French Consul in Huế. He offered a peace treaty, but remained unsuccessful, and left Vietnam definitively with Philippe Vannier and their families in December 1824. On 12 January 1825, an embassy led by Captains Hyacinthe de Bougainville and Courson de la Ville-Hélio arrived in Đà Nẵng, with the warships Thétis and Espérance. Although they had numerous presents from the Emperor and a letter from Louis XVIII delivered on 8 January 1824, the ambassadors could not obtain an audience from Minh Mạng.

== Resistance to missionaries ==
In 1825, emperor Minh Mạng issued an edict prohibiting foreign missionaries in Vietnam, following the infiltration of Father Regéreau from the Thétis when it was anchored in Đà Nẵng. In his edict, Minh Mạng asserted that Christianity perverted the people:

"The Westerner's perverse religion confuses the hearts of men. For a long time, many Western ships have come to trade with us and to introduce Catholic missionaries into our country. These missionaries make the people's hearts crooked, thus destroying our beautiful customs. Truly this is a great disaster for our land. Our purpose being to prevent our people from abandoning our orthodox way, we must accordingly completely eliminate these abuses."

— Minh Mạng 1825 Edict against Christianity.

As the prohibition proved largely ineffective, and missionaries continued their activities in Vietnam, especially under the protection of the governor of Cochinchina Lê Văn Duyệt, a total ban on Roman Catholicism as well as French and Vietnamese priests was enacted following their support of the Lê Văn Khôi revolt (1833–1835), leading to persecutions of French missionaries and the execution of Father Joseph Marchand in 1835. These events fed in France a desire to intervene and protect the Roman Catholic faith.

=== Attempt at overture ===
Following the defeat of China by Great Britain in the Opium War, emperor Minh Mạng attempted to build an alliance with European powers by sending a delegation under the mandarin Ton That Tuong in 1840. They were received in Paris by Prime Minister Marshal Soult and the Commerce Minister, but they were shunned by King Louis-Philippe. This came after the Paris Foreign Missions Society and the Vatican had urged a rebuke for an "enemy of the religion". The embassy offered in vain a trade monopoly for France, in exchange for the promise of military support in case of an attack by another country. An attempt to make a treaty with America also failed when Minh Mạng died in 1841.

Minh Mạng's successor, Thiệu Trị, also upheld the anti-Catholic policy of his predecessor but tried to avoid direct confrontations. Captain Favin-Lévêque, arriving in Đà Nẵng in 1840 on board the corvette Héroïne, obtained from Thiệu Trị the release of five imprisoned missionaries.

== Naval interventions (1843–1847) ==
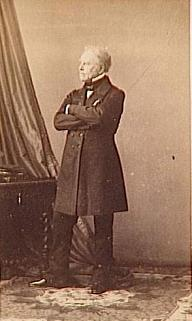
The first attack by France against Vietnam occurred under the command of Jean-Baptiste Cécille in 1847.

In 1843, the French Foreign Minister, François Guizot, sent a fleet to the East under Admiral Jean-Baptiste Cécille and Captain Charner, together with the diplomat Lagrene. The move responded to the successes of the British in China in 1842, and France hoped to counterbalance these successes by accessing China from the south. The pretext however was to support British efforts in China, and to fight the persecution of French missionaries in Vietnam.

In 1845, Cécille was dispatched to Vietnam in order to obtain the release of Bishop Dominique Lefèbvre, who had been condemned to death (the request for the intervention of the French Navy had been transmitted to Cécille by Captain John Percival of the USS Constitution).

In 1847, Cécille sent two warships (Gloire and Victorieuse) under Captains Lapierre and Charles Rigault de Genouilly to Đà Nẵng (Tourane) in Vietnam to obtain the liberation of two imprisoned French missionaries, Bishop Dominique Lefèbvre (imprisoned for a second time as he had re-entered Vietnam secretly) and Duclos, and freedom of worship for Catholics in Vietnam. As negotiations drew on without results, on April 15, 1847, a fight named the Bombardment of Đà Nẵng erupted between the French fleet and Vietnamese ships, four Vietnamese ships were sunk as a result. The French fleet then sailed away.

== Territorial conquest ==
In 1858, Charles Rigault de Genouilly attacked Vietnam under the orders of Napoleon III following the failed mission of diplomat Charles de Montigny. His stated mission was to stop the persecution of Catholic missionaries in the country and assure the unimpeded propagation of the faith. Rigault de Genouilly, with 14 French gunships, 3,000 men and 300 Filipino troops provided by the Spanish, attacked the port of Đà Nẵng in 1858, causing significant damages, and occupying the city. After a few months, Rigault had to leave the city due to supply issues and illnesses.

=== Conquest of Cochinchina (1862–1874) ===
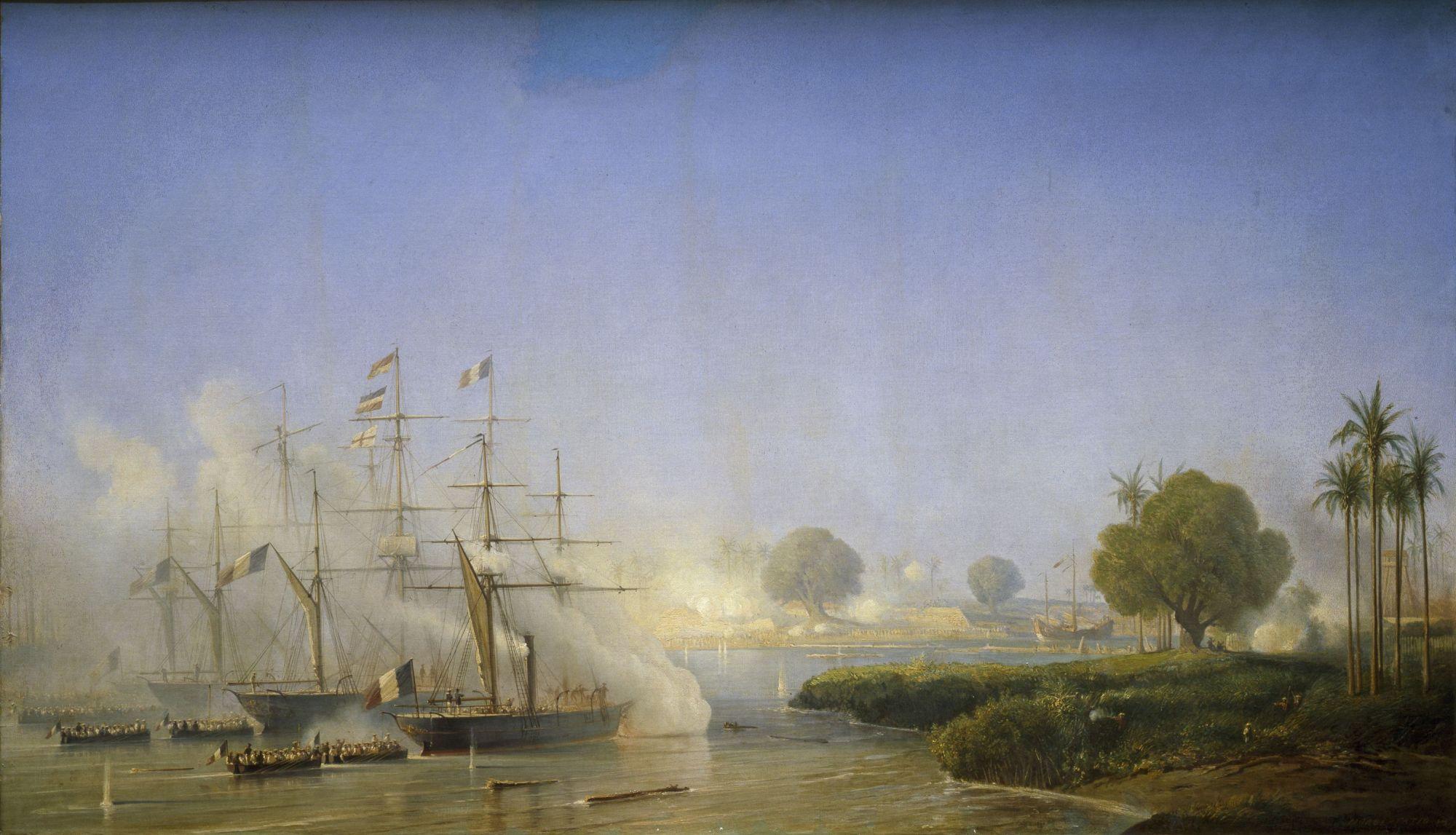
Capture of Saigon by Charles Rigault de Genouilly on 18 February 1859, painted by Antoine Morel-Fatio.

Sailing south, De Genouilly then accomplished the Capture of Saigon, a poorly defended city, on 18 February 1859. De Genouilly was criticized for his actions and was replaced by Admiral Page in November 1859, with instructions to obtain a treaty protecting the Roman Catholic faith in Vietnam, but not to try to obtain territorial gains. Due to the resumption of fighting in China during the Second Opium War, Admiral Page had to divert most of his force to China, to support Admiral Charner there. In April 1860, Page was recalled to France and replaced by captain d’Aries. The Franco-Spanish force in Saigon, now only numbering about 1,000, was besieged by about 10,000 Vietnamese forces from March 1860 to February 1861. Finally, following the French victory in China at the Battle of Palikao, reinforcements of 70 ships under Admiral Charner and 3,500 soldiers under General Vassoigne were dispatched to Saigon, so that the French were able to defeat the besieging Vietnamese at the battle of Chin Hoa (Ky Hoa) on 25 February 1861. Admiral Bonnard forced the entrance of the Mekong river, and seized Mỹ Tho.

On 13 April 1862, the Vietnamese government was forced to negotiate and officially cede the territories of Biên Hòa, Gia Định and Định Tường to France in the 1862 Treaty of Saigon, confirmed by the Treaty of Huế (1863).

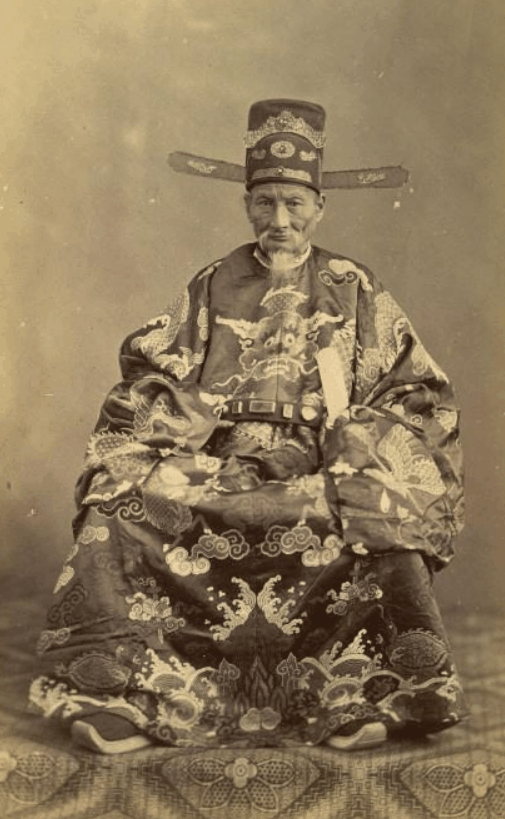
Phan Thanh Giản in Paris in 1863.

An embassy was sent to France under Phan Thanh Giản in 1863, to try to recover the territories lost to France. Although Napoleon III initially accepted Phan Thanh Giản's plea, the agreement was finally canceled in 1864, under pressure from Napoleon's cabinet led by the Minister of the Navy and the Colonies Chasseloup-Laubat.

In 1864, all the French territories in southern Vietnam were declared to be the new French colony of Cochinchina. In 1866, France started the exploration of the Mekong river, with the objective of reaching the riches of China, under Ernest Doudart de Lagrée and Francis Garnier. They reached the Yunnan, discovering that the Mekong was not navigable as far as China. They found out instead that the Song-Koï river in Tonkin would be a good alternative.

In 1867 the provinces of Châu Đốc, Hà Tiên and Vĩnh Long were added to French-controlled territory by Admiral La Grandière. Admiral Dupré became Governor of Cochinchina. The Vietnamese Emperor formally recognized French dominion over Cochinchina in 1874, in the 1874 Treaty of Saigon, negotiated by Paul-Louis-Félix Philastre.

=== Protectorate over Annam and Tonkin (1883) ===
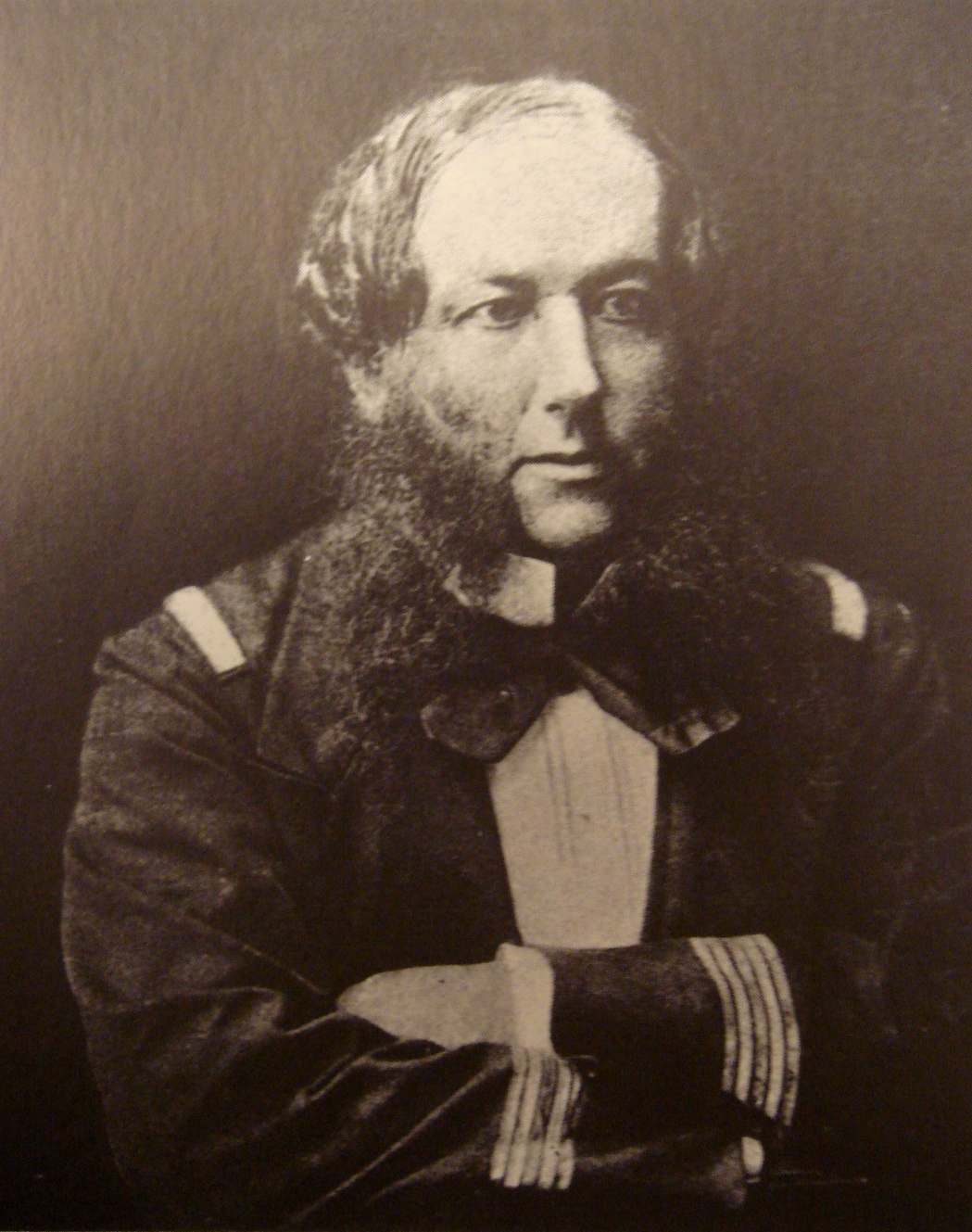
Captain Henri Rivière was killed by the Black Flags in 1883.

In 1873, Francis Garnier was put in charge of an expedition to Tonkin, with the mission of protecting French interests there, following the troubles encountered by the French trader Jean Dupuis. Garnier disembarked in Hanoi on 3 November 1873, but negotiations were not forthcoming. On November 20, Garnier made an assault of the Hanoi citadelle, and pacified the delta, with nine officers, 175 men and two gunboats. The Black Flags resisted the French intrusion, entering into a guerrilla campaign that led to the killing of Garnier on 21 December 1873.

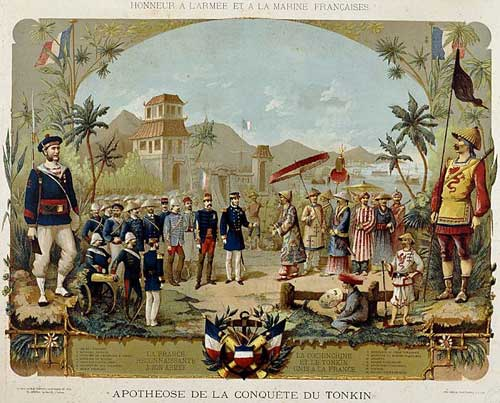
Admiral Courbet in Huế.

In March 1882, Captain Henri Rivière again visited Hanoi with three gunboats and 700 men in order to obtain a trade agreement. Following some provocations, Rivière captured Hanoi in April 1882. Again the Black Flags counter-attacked, and Rivière was killed in May 1883 in the Battle of Paper Bridge, leading to a huge movement in France in favour of a massive armed intervention. Credits were voted for, and a large force of 4,000 men and 29 warships (including 4 ironclads) was sent. Admiral Amédée Courbet would be leading the force in Tonkin, while Admiral Meyer would operate in China.

Following a failed ultimatum, on 18–19 August 1883, Courbet bombarded the forts of the capital of Huế. The forts were occupied on the 20th. The gunboats Lynx and Vipère reached the capital. On August 25, the Vietnamese court accepted to sign the Treaty of Hué (1883). A French protectorate over the remaining of Vietnam (Annam and Tonkin) was recognized through the treaty.

=== Tonkin Campaign (1883–85) and Sino-French War (1884–85) ===
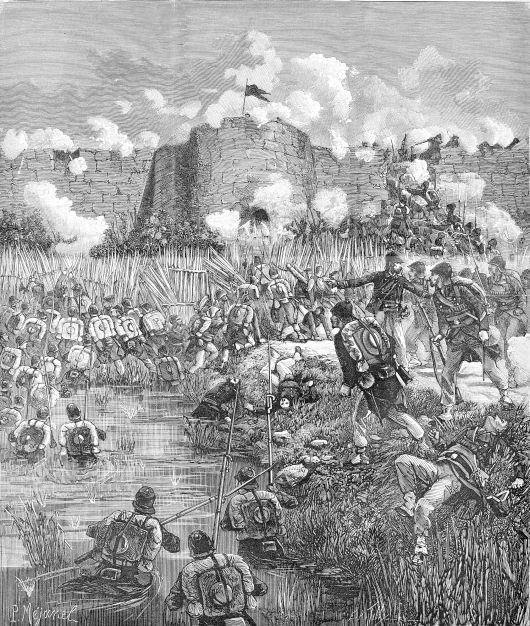
The capture of Sơn Tây, 16 December 1883.

The next objective of the French was to take full control of the Tonkin. In October 1883, Courbet was placed in command of the Tonkin Expeditionary Corps. In December 1883, he led the Sơn Tây Campaign against the Black Flags. French casualties were heavy (83 dead and 320 wounded), but the Black Flags were greatly weakened as a result of the campaign.

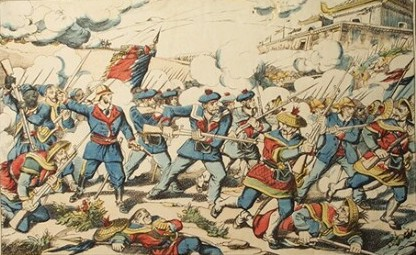
Turcos and fusiliers-marins at Bắc Ninh.

The Bắc Ninh Campaign (March 1884) was one of a series of clashes between French and Chinese forces in Tonkin (northern Vietnam) in the period. The campaign, which lasted from 6 to 24 March, resulted in the French capture of Bắc Ninh and the complete defeat of China's Guangxi Army.

China, the traditional overlord of Vietnam, kept contesting French influence in the area and was supporting Annam as well as the Black Flags on its territory at the frontier with Tonkin. Although a treaty had been signed between France and China (11 May 1884 the Tientsin Accord) promising Chinese evacuation from Tonkin, military confrontations continued as in the Bắc Lệ ambush (June 1884). These tensions led to the Sino-French War (1884–85), which ultimately forced China to totally disengage from Vietnam and confirmed the French possessions.

== French Indochina (1887–1945) ==
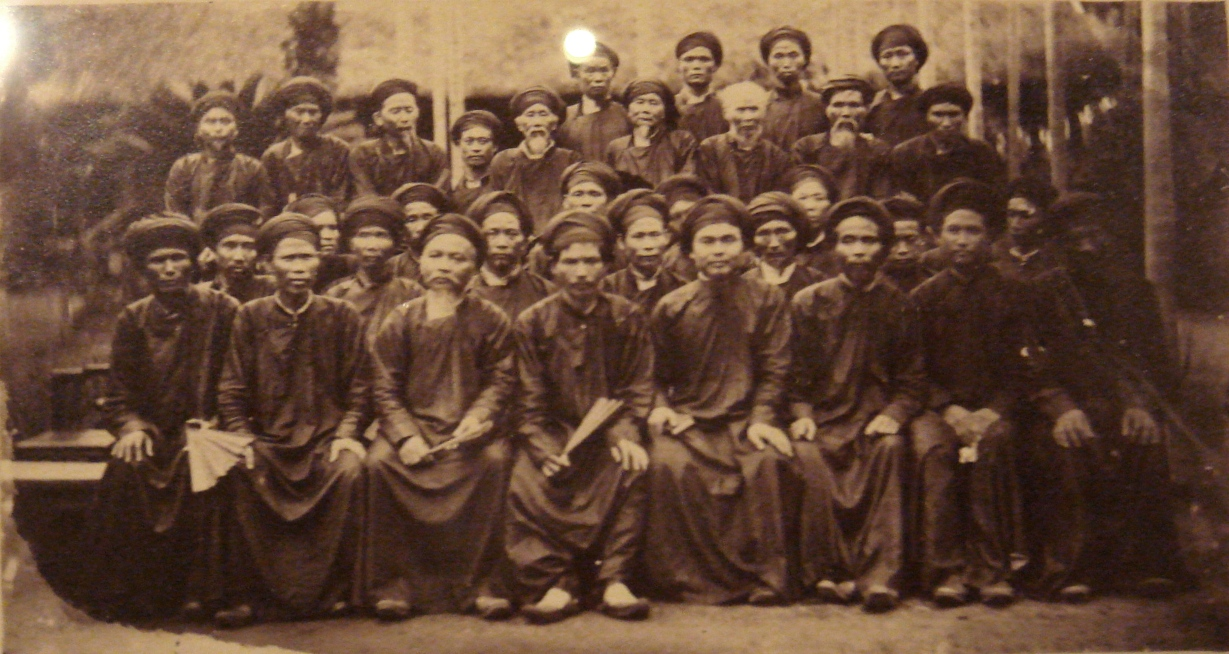
Native priests of the Western Tonkin Vicariate

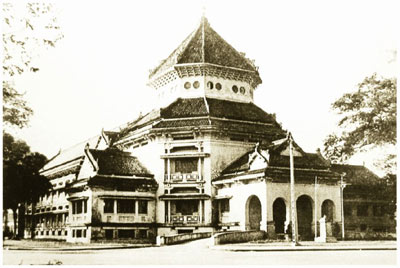
École Française d'Extrême-Orient in Hanoi

French Indochina was officially formed in October 1887 from Annam, Tonkin, Cochinchina (which together form modern Vietnam) and the Kingdom of Cambodia following the Sino-French war (1884–1885). Jean Antoine Ernest Constans became the first Governor-General of French Indochina on 16 November 1887. Laos was added after the Franco-Siamese conflict of 1893.

The federation lasted until 1954. In the four protectorates, the French formally left the local rulers in power, who were the Emperors of Vietnam, Kings of Cambodia, and Kings of Luang Prabang, but in fact gathered all powers in their hands, the local rulers acting only as heads.

France stayed in Indochina during World War II, tolerated by the Japanese Army.

== Indochina wars (1945–1975) ==
France–North Vietnam relations
- France: North Vietnam

France–South Vietnam relations
- France: South Vietnam

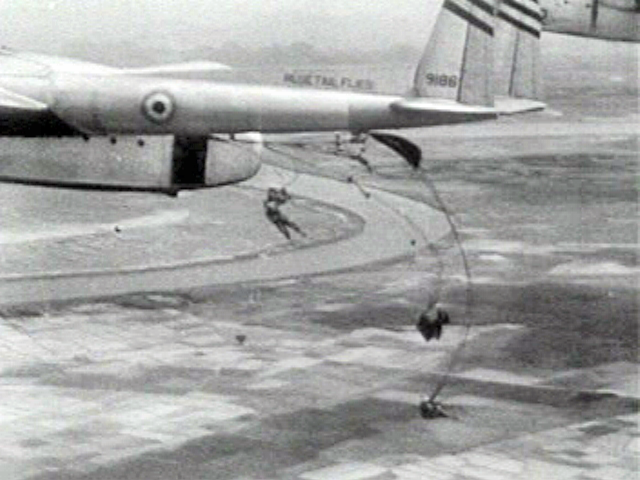
French Union paratroops dropping from a "Flying Boxcar" during the Battle of Dien Bien Phu.

In 1945, Ho Chi Minh declared the independence of the Democratic Republic of Vietnam, later recognized by communist China and the Soviet Union in 1950, while the United States and other Western countries recognized the State of Vietnam. The First Indochina War lasted until the 1954 Geneva Conference, after the Battle of Điện Biên Phủ. This led to the partition of Vietnam into the North Vietnam and South Vietnam. It was at the Geneva Conference that marked the end of French involvement in the region, and France relinquished any claim to territory in the Indochinese peninsula. Laos and Cambodia also became independent in 1954, but were both drawn into the Vietnam War, also known as the Second Indochina War.

On 11 October 1972, United States Navy jets attacked the Gia Lâm railway yard in Hanoi. An explosion in the French mission complex across the Red River and 3 miles (4.8 km) southwest of the railway yard severely injured chief diplomat Pierre Susini, who later died of his wounds. Five North Vietnamese employees of the mission were also killed. The French and North Vietnamese blamed the U.S., while the U.S. said the damage may have been caused by a falling SA-2 surface-to-air missile.

== Post-war relations (1973–present) ==
France recognized North Vietnam and established diplomatic relations on 12 April 1973.

In 1990, François Mitterrand became the first French President to visit Vietnam in order to increase cooperation between France and its former colony. Since then, France has continued to maintain close relations with Vietnam, due to the historical connections between the two nations and Vietnam's presence in the Organisation internationale de la Francophonie.

== Resident diplomatic missions ==
- France has an embassy in Hanoi and a consulate-general in Ho Chi Minh City.
- Vietnam has an embassy in Paris.
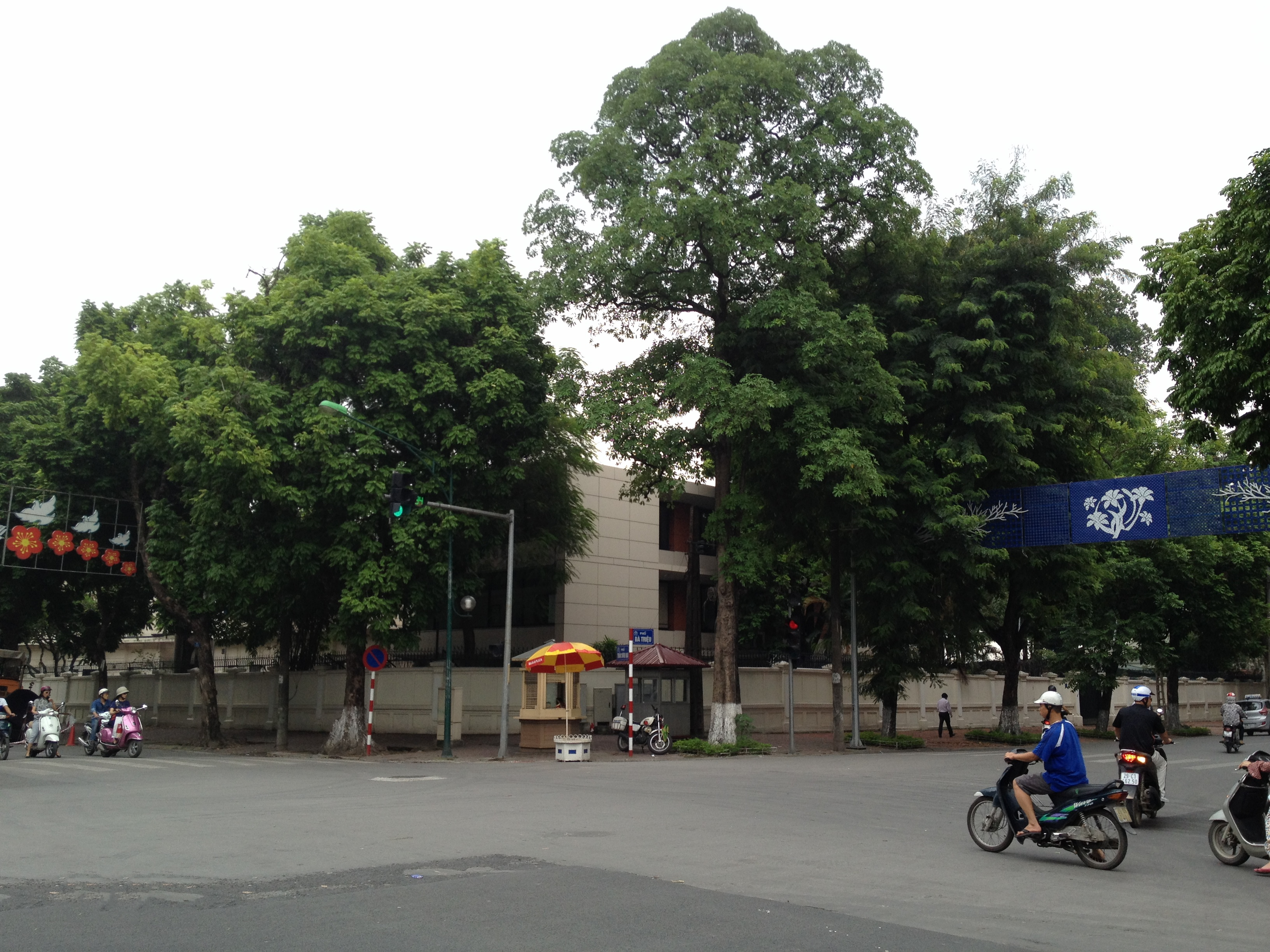
Embassy of France in Hanoi

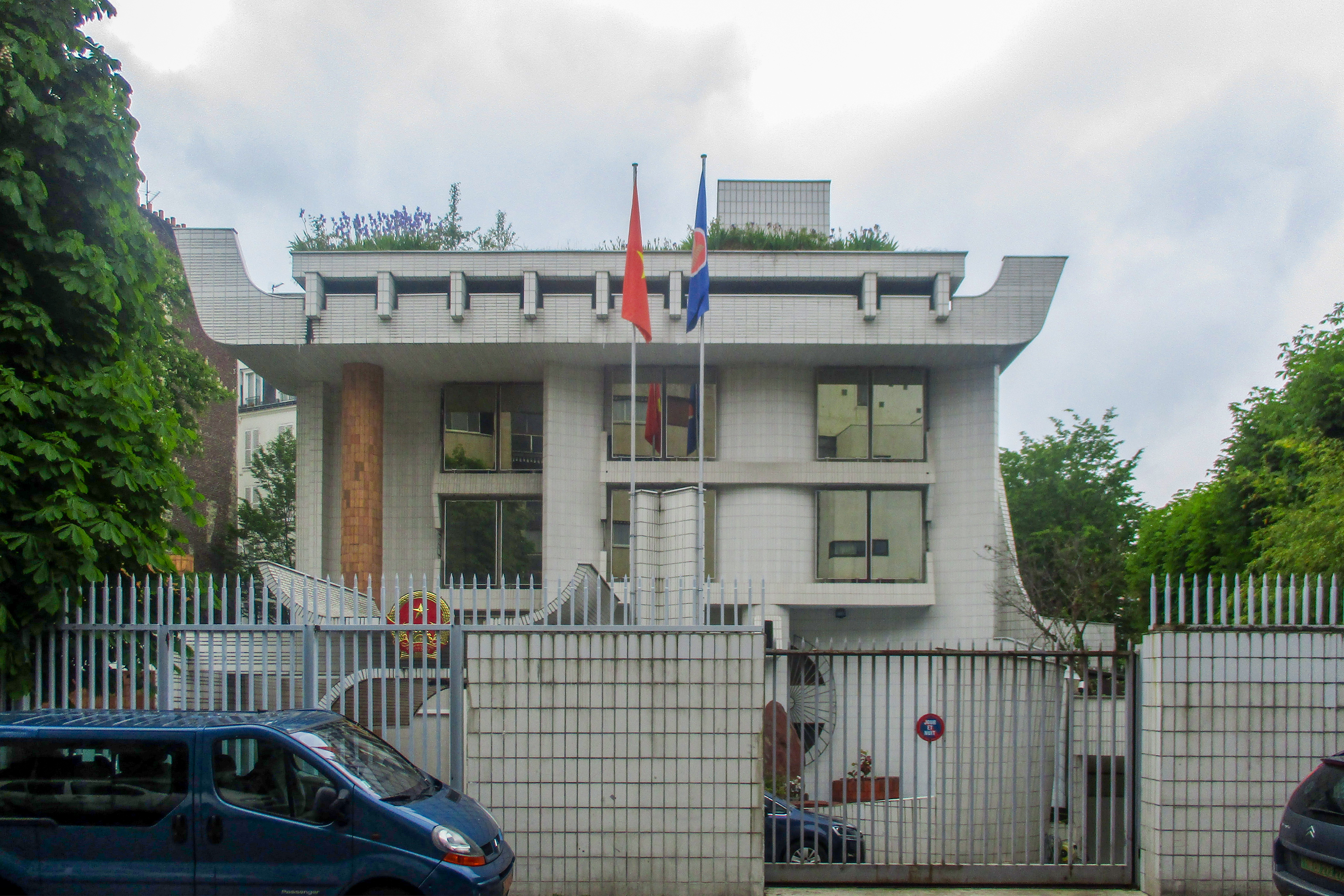
Embassy of Vietnam in Paris

== See also ==
- French language in Vietnam
- Vietnamese people in France
