= Laurent André Barisy =

18th century French adventurer

Laurent-André-Estiennet-Marie Barisy (also spelled Barizy; 8 November 1769 – 23 July 1802) was an adventurer who went into the service of Nguyễn Ánh, the future emperor Gia Long of Nguyễn dynasty, Vietnam.

Laurent Barisy was born in Port Louis, Isle de France (modern Mauritius). He was originally from Groix, Brittany, France. Official documents were silent on his nationality. Some scholars thought he was an English person.

Barisy was a friend of Olivier de Puymanel. He entered Nguyễn Ánh's service in 1793, and spent most of his time buying military supplies in Malacca, Manila and Batavia. He served as lieutenant-colonel in army of Nguyễn lord. He was the commander of warship l'Armide, and granted the noble title Thiện Tri Hầu ("Marquess Thiện Tri") by Nguyễn Ánh. He participated in the battle of Đà Nẵng and Phú Xuân (modern Huế) in 1801. He died on 23 July 1802 before Lord Nguyễn Ánh captured Thăng Long (modern Hanoi) and reunified Vietnam.

Barisy married a Vietnamese woman. One of his daughters was the second wife of Jean-Baptiste Chaigneau.
