= Jean-Baptiste Chaigneau =

French sailor and adventurer (1769–1832)

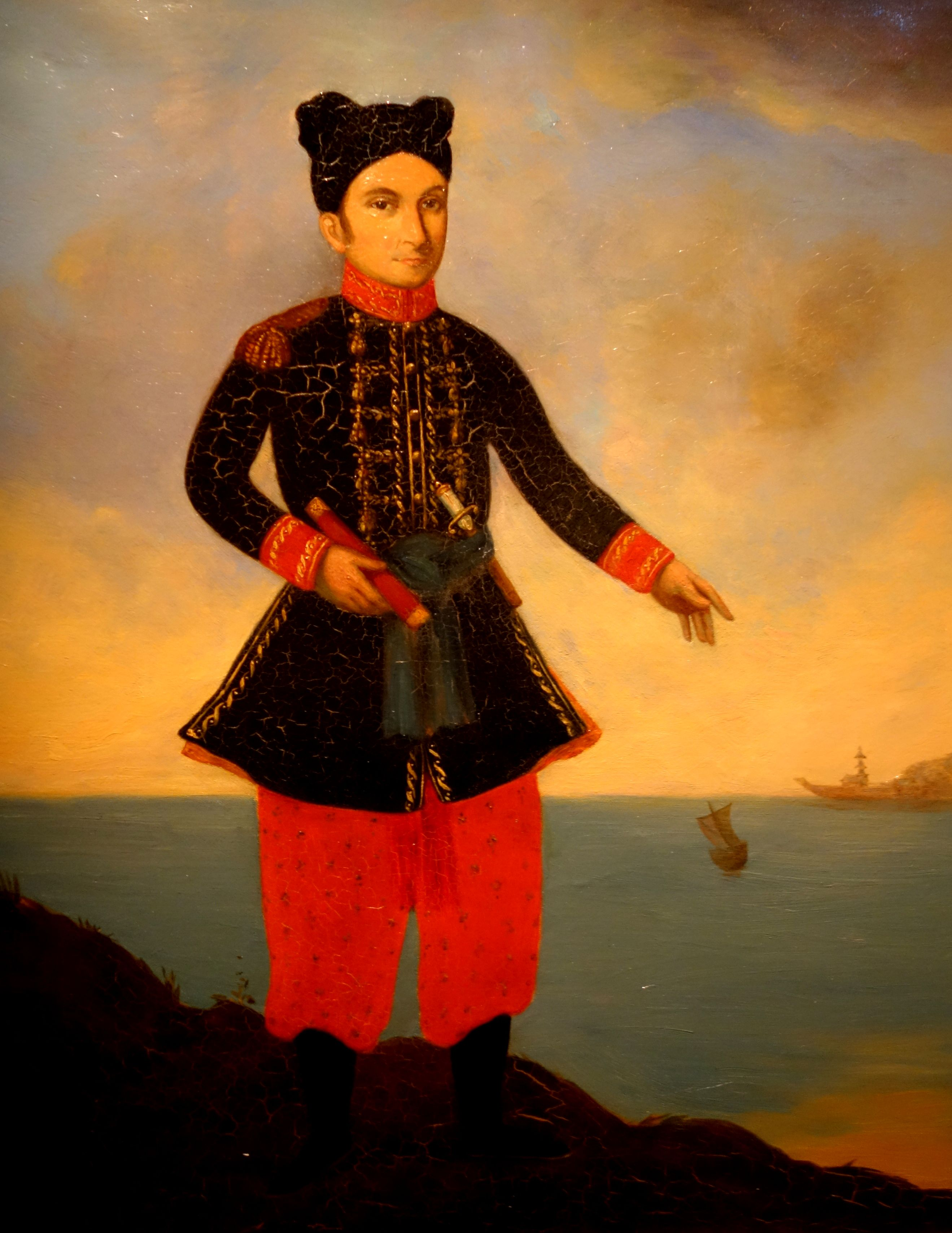
- 1805 portrait of Chaigneau
- Born: 6 August 1769; Lorient, Morbihan, France
- Died: 31 January 1832 (aged 62) Lorient, Morbihan France
- Allegiance: France; Vietnam
- Branch: French Navy; Vietnamese Navy
- Service years: 1794–1819; 1821–1826
- Rank: Grand Mandarin; French consul
- Conflicts: Thi Nai, 1801

Jean-Baptiste Chaigneau (6 August 1769 – 31 January 1832) was a French sailor and adventurer who played an important role in Vietnam in the 19th century. He served the Nguyễn dynasty from 1794 to 1819, and 1821 to 1826, and took the Vietnamese name of Nguyễn Văn Thắng (阮文勝).

== Role in Vietnam ==
Jean-Baptiste Chaigneau was among the soldiers who were gathered by Father Pierre Pigneau de Behaine to support the efforts of Nguyễn Phúc Ánh to conquer Vietnam. He came to Vietnam with Pigneau in 1794. Chaigneau supported the offensives of Nguyễn Ánh, such as the 1801 naval offensive in Thi Nai.

Once Nguyễn Ánh became emperor Gia Long, Chaigneau remained at the court. A few years later, the emperor made him successively General of the Northern Army, Marquis of Thang-Duc, Minister of the Navy and "great mandarin", having - for twenty-five years - in particular founded and developed a Western-style fleet. Chaigneau received the title of truong co, together with Philippe Vannier, de Forsans and Despiau, meaning second-class second-degree military mandarins, and later received the title of Grand Mandarin once Gia Long became emperor, with personal escorts of 50 soldiers. He also married into a Vietnamese Catholic mandarin family, as did Vannier or Laurent Barizy. He married Ho Thi Hue, of the Ho Catholic family.

Chaigneau became a Counsellor to Emperor Gia Long under the Vietnamese name of Nguyen Van Thang. From 1816, he was in relation with the French Foreign Minister Armand-Emmanuel du Plessis, Duc de Richelieu.

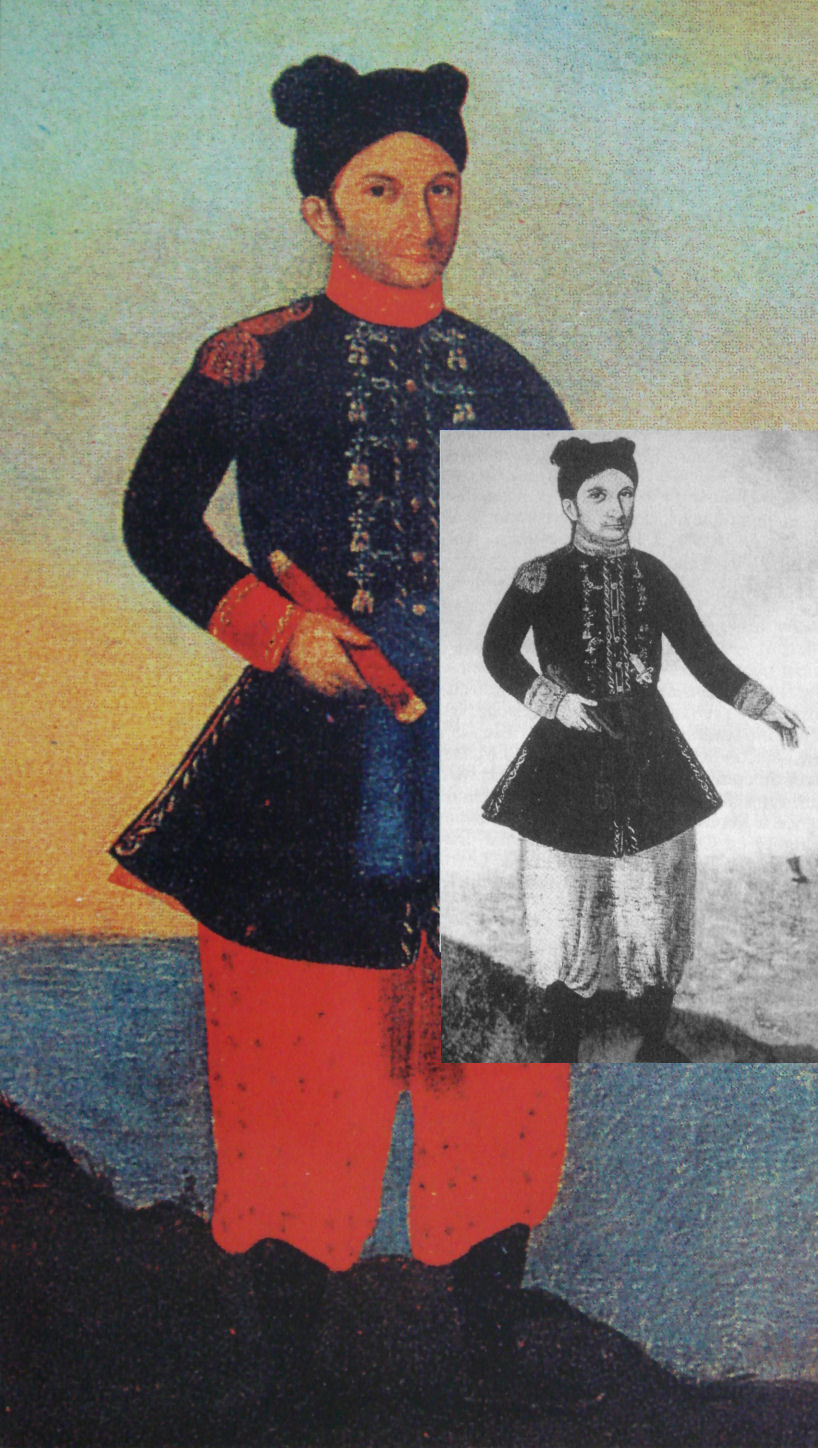
The two known paintings of Chaigneau (in color: original painting, revealed after restoration, black-and-white: later painting, before restoration)

Chaigneau then traveled to France on the Henri in 1819, and returned to Vietnam in 1821, as the French consul in Huế (he was the first French Consul in Cochinchina), with mission to obtain more trade privileges for France. He offered to Emperor Minh Mạng a peace treaty with France, but this was rejected. The emperor gave him the choice of committing suicide or returning to France. Discouraged, he left Vietnam in 1824 with his new wife, Hélène (1800-1853), daughter of his companion in misfortune, Laurent André Barisy, a naval officer from the island of Groix who died in Hué, and of an unknown Vietnamese mother. They arrived in Bordeaux via Singapore on board the Courrier-de-la-Paix on 6 September 1825, then headed for Brittany.

He was made a Knight of the Legion of Honour on 26 August 1818 and of the Order of Saint-Louis on 14 July 1820. He is buried in Lorient in the Carnel cemetery.

In 1826, his nephew Eugène Chaigneau was sent to Vietnam to replace him as Consul, but Eugène was denied any audience with the Emperor.

Chaigneau had a son, Nguyen Van Duc, also known as Michel Duc Chaigneau, who wrote a memoir on his early life in Huế (Souvenirs de Huế) and played a role in the embassy of Phan Thanh Gian to France in 1863. In France, he became a commissioner for the Ministry of Finance. Another of his sons, Jean Chaigneau, also a half-Vietnamese, later became secretary general of the city of Rennes.

== Depictions ==
Two depictions of Chaigneau are known: one in which he wears rather Westernized clothing, which is actually a paintover of an original painting in which he wears distinctly Vietnamese clothing, discovered underneath after restoration. The original painting, probably painted around 1805 when Chaigneau was about 35, is strongly reminiscent of the uniforms worn by the soldiers of Emperor Gia Long. Beneath his blue jacket, Chaigneau wears a full Vietnamese dress of red color, with small flowers visible on the pair of trousers, which suggests that he was a member of the Imperial family (as with other French officers, Chaigneau apparently received the honour of being considered part of the Imperial family). The roll he wears in his right hand probably indicates the mandarinal rank he received from the emperor.

== Works ==
- Mémoire sur la Cochinchine (Memoir on Cochin China), 1820

== See also ==
- France–Vietnam relations
