= Philippe Vannier =

French naval officer

- Born: 1762; Auray, Kingdom of France
- Died: 1842 (aged 79–80) Lorient, France
- Allegiance: France; Vietnam
- Branch: French Navy; Vietnamese Navy
- Rank: General
- Conflicts: Qui Nhơn, 1792; Qui Nhơn, 1801

Philippe Vannier (Vietnamese name: Nguyễn Văn Chấn / 阮文震, 1762–1842) was a French Navy officer and an adventurer who went into the service of Nguyễn Ánh, the future emperor Gia Long of Vietnam.

== Life ==
Vannier was born in Brittany, in the town of Auray. He had served from 1778 in the Royal French Navy, and had reportedly fought in the American War of Independence.

Philippe Vannier entered the service of Nguyễn Ánh in 1789 following the encouragements of Mgr Pigneau de Béhaine. In 1790, Nguyễn Ánh gave him the command of one of his ships. In 1792 he was in command of a warship furnished by Jean-Marie Dayot, and fought at the battle of Qui Nhơn. In 1800, Philippe Vannier was commander of the Phoenix (Phuong-Phi), the largest ship of Nguyễn Ánh's navy, with 26 guns and 300 men. In April 1801, he again fought in front of the harbour of Qui Nhơn, and was nominated General (Brigadier) of the Navy. The battle opened the way for Nguyễn Ánh's invasion of northern Vietnam.

His second-in-command was another Frenchman, Renon, from Saint Malo.

After the end of the war in 1802 and the victory of Nguyễn Ánh, Philippe Vannier remained in the service of the Vietnamese emperor, as a Mandarin. He married a Vietnamese Christian woman named Madeleine Sel-Dong, with whom he had several children. He served Nguyen under the name Nguyen Van Chan until 1826, but then left Vietnam at the same time as Jean-Baptiste Chaigneau, soon after the accession of Minh Mạng to the throne.

Philippe Vannier died in Lorient on 6 June 1842. His Vietnamese wife died in the same city on 6 April 1878.

One of their grandsons, Emile Vannier, was a Navy officer who participated to the Cochinchina campaign in 1863–1864, and died in 1885.

== See also ==
- France-Vietnam relations
