= Jean Marie Despiau =

French physician

Jean Marie Despiau (?–1824), also spelled Jean-Marie Despiaux (J. M. Despiaux for short), was a French physician, later a mandarin of Nguyễn dynasty, Vietnam.

Born in Bazas, Gironde. He arrived in Cochinchina from Macau in 1795. He became the personal physician of Nguyễn Ánh (later Emperor Gia Long). Later, he served as an imperial physician of Nguyễn dynasty from 1802 until he died in 1824.

Dr. Despiau was trusted by Gia Long. In 1802, Gia Long took his advice about organising medical assistance to the indigenous people, and established provincial physicians throughout Vietnam for the sick, the elderly, the incurable, the infirm, and the indigent. He was described "enjoyed no political influence at all". After the accession of Minh Mạng to the throne, he remained in the new emperor's favor. In 1820, he was dispatched to Macau for smallpox vaccine.

== See also ==
- French assistance to Nguyễn Ánh
- France-Vietnam relations
