= Viceroys of Vietnam =

Vietnamese royalty

In Vietnamese history, the position of viceroy (總鎮; Tổng Trấn) existed for 30 years, during the reign of the Gia Long Emperor and the early years of the Minh Mạng Emperor of the Nguyễn dynasty. They were abolished by the Minh Mạng Emperor in 1831, and replaced with provincial governors.

== Viceroys of Tonkin (Bắc thành) ==
Bắc thành tổng trấn chi ấn (北城總鎮之印).

- Nguyễn Văn Thành (1802–1806)
- Trương Tấn Bửu (1806–1810)
- Nguyễn Huỳnh Đức (1810–1816)
- Lê Chất (1819–1826)

- 67

== Viceroys of Cochinchina (Gia Định thành) ==
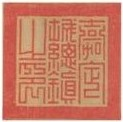
Gia Định thành tổng trấn chi ấn (嘉定城總鎮之印).

- Nguyễn Văn Trương (1805–1807)
- Nguyễn Văn Nhơn (1808–1810)
- Trương Tấn Bửu (1810–1812)
- Lê Văn Duyệt (1812–1815, 1820–1832)
- Nguyễn Huỳnh Đức (1815–1819)
