= Tomb of Lê Văn Duyệt =

Royal tomb of the Nguyễn dynasty in Vietnam

Coordinates: 10.801881°N 106.696907°E

- Thượng Công Miếu
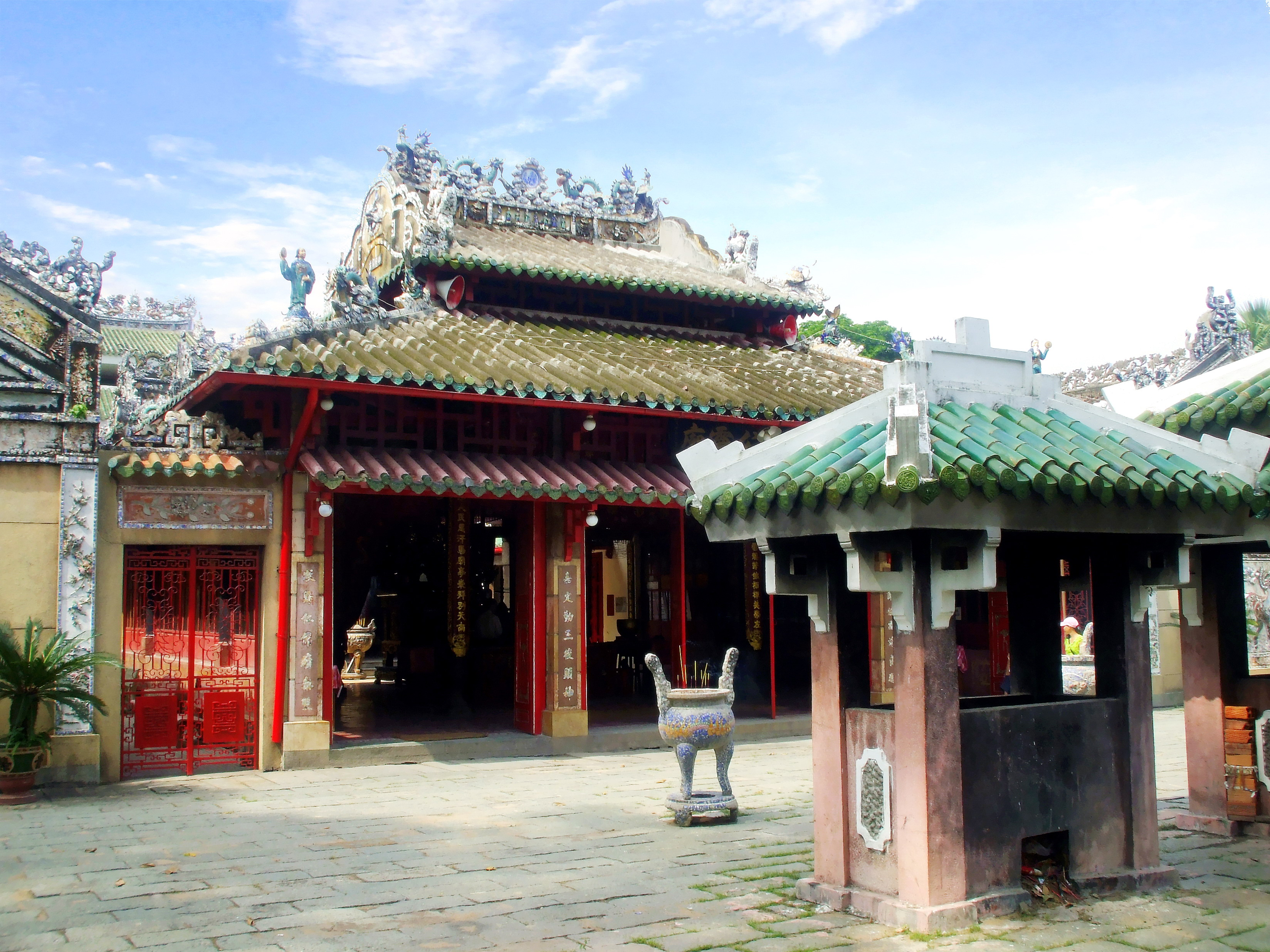
- Main worship palace of the tomb
- Interactive map of the Tomb of Lê Văn Duyệt area
- Alternative names: Lăng Tả Quân Quận Công Lê Văn Duyệt; Lăng Ông - Bà Chiểu

General information
- Type: Tomb complex
- Location: Bình Thạnh District, Ho Chi Minh City, Vietnam, No.1 Vũ Tùng st., Ward 1
- Construction started: 19th century
- Renovated: 1937; 2008

Tomb of Lê Văn Duyệt (Vietnamese: Lăng Tả quân Lê Văn Duyệt), also known as Tomb of the Marshal in Ba Chieu (Lăng Ông - Bà Chiểu), is a Vietnamese tomb located in Bình Thạnh District, Ho Chi Minh City, Vietnam. The tomb was originally built for Marshal Lê Văn Duyệt and his wife but later became some other Nguyễn dynasty's mandarins worship house.

== History ==
Lê Văn Duyệt (1763–1831) was a Vietnamese general who helped Nguyễn Ánh put down the Tây Sơn rebellion and unify Vietnam.

Born into a family of peasants nearby Tiền Giang, Duyet joined prince Nguyễn Ánh's side in fighting the Tây Sơn rebellion. Because of Duyet's military ability, he quickly rose through the rank of Nguyễn army and became a marshal when the Tây Sơn-Nguyễn war ended. After the foundation of Nguyễn Dynasty, Duyet served as a high-ranking mandarin and, later, viceroy of southern part of Vietnam. His governance greatly stabilized and developed the south of Vietnam, turning it into a wealthy and peaceful region. In addition, Duyet opposed emperor Minh Mạng's succession and defended Christian missionaries and converts from the emperor's isolationalist and Confucian policies.

On 3 July 1832, Lê Văn Duyệt died in the Citadel of Saigon at the age of 68. He was buried at Bình Hòa, Gia Định (present day Bình Thạnh District, Ho Chi Minh City). His tomb was called "Lăng Ông (ở) Bà Chiểu" (Tomb of the Marshal in Ba Chieu) by the local people as it in a residential area called as Bà Chiểu.

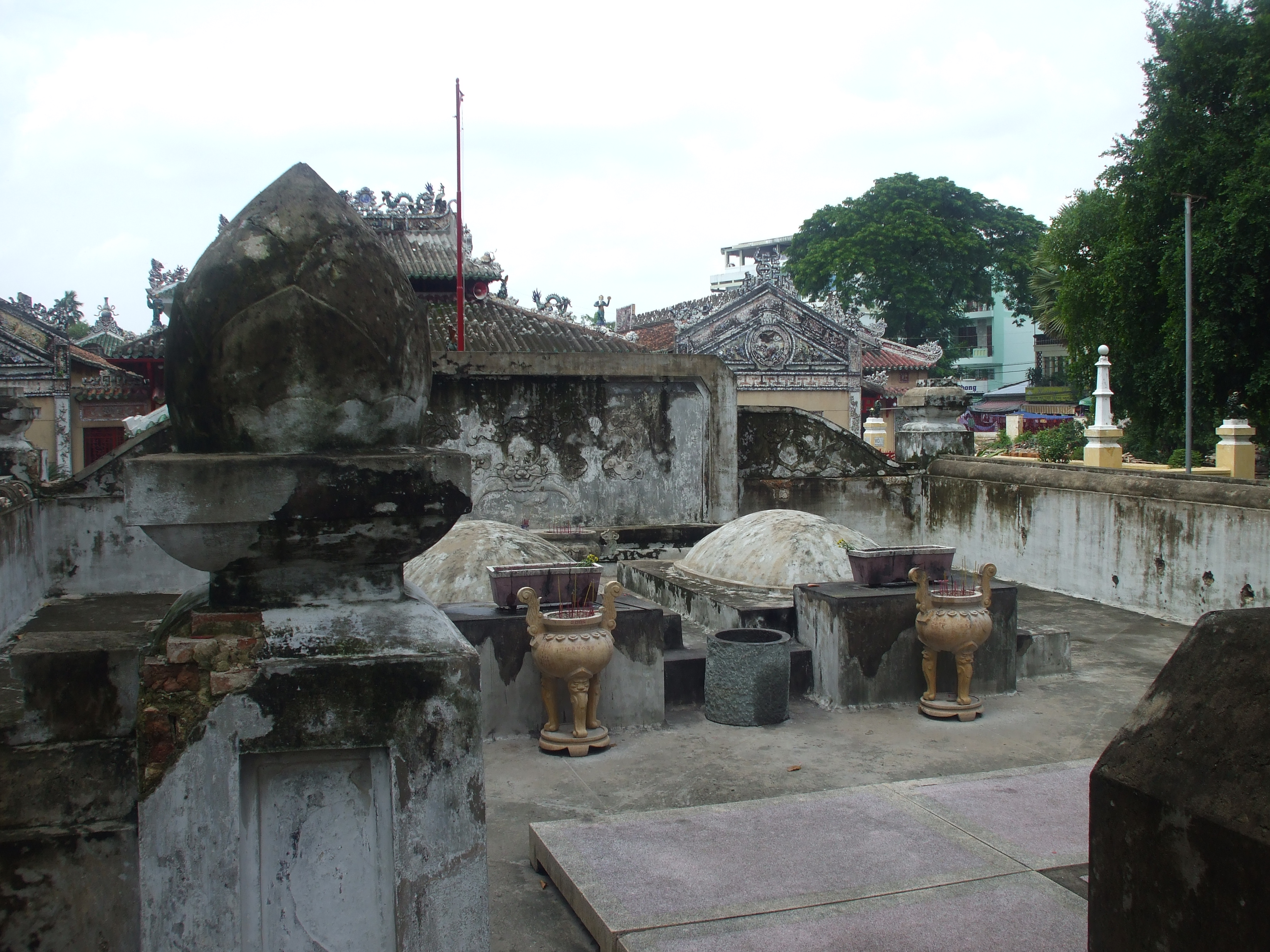
Grave of Lê Văn Duyệt and his wife before 2008

Duyet's death opened the way for Minh Mạng to apply his policies in the south, as the viceroy's successor would have lacked the influence to defy the emperor. The emperor also tried to reduce Duyet's followers’ political power by abolishing the post of viceroy and putting the south under his direct rule, thus making Duyet the last viceroy. Soon after Duyet's death, Minh Mạng's new appointees arrived and took over the local administration. The new officials then launched an investigation and reported that Duyet and his aides had engaged in corruption and abusive practices.

As a result, Bạch Xuân Nguyên, who led the investigation, ordered the posthumous humiliation of Duyet. This resulted in the desecration of his tomb, the execution of sixteen relatives, and the arrests of his colleagues. Minh Mạng's attitude led Lê Văn Khôi, an adopted son of Lê Văn Duyệt, to revolt against the emperor.

After suppressing the revolt, the emperor had Duyet's tomb desecrated and had a stele with the inscription "Đây chỗ tên lại cái lộng quyền Lê Văn Duyệt chịu phép nước" (Here the eunuch Lê Văn Duyệt who abused power was subjugated by law) placed over the ruins. The tomb remained in disrepair until the reign of next emperor, Thiệu Trị, who rehabilitated Duyet and restored his tomb. Then, emperor Tự Đức turned the tomb into a national monument.

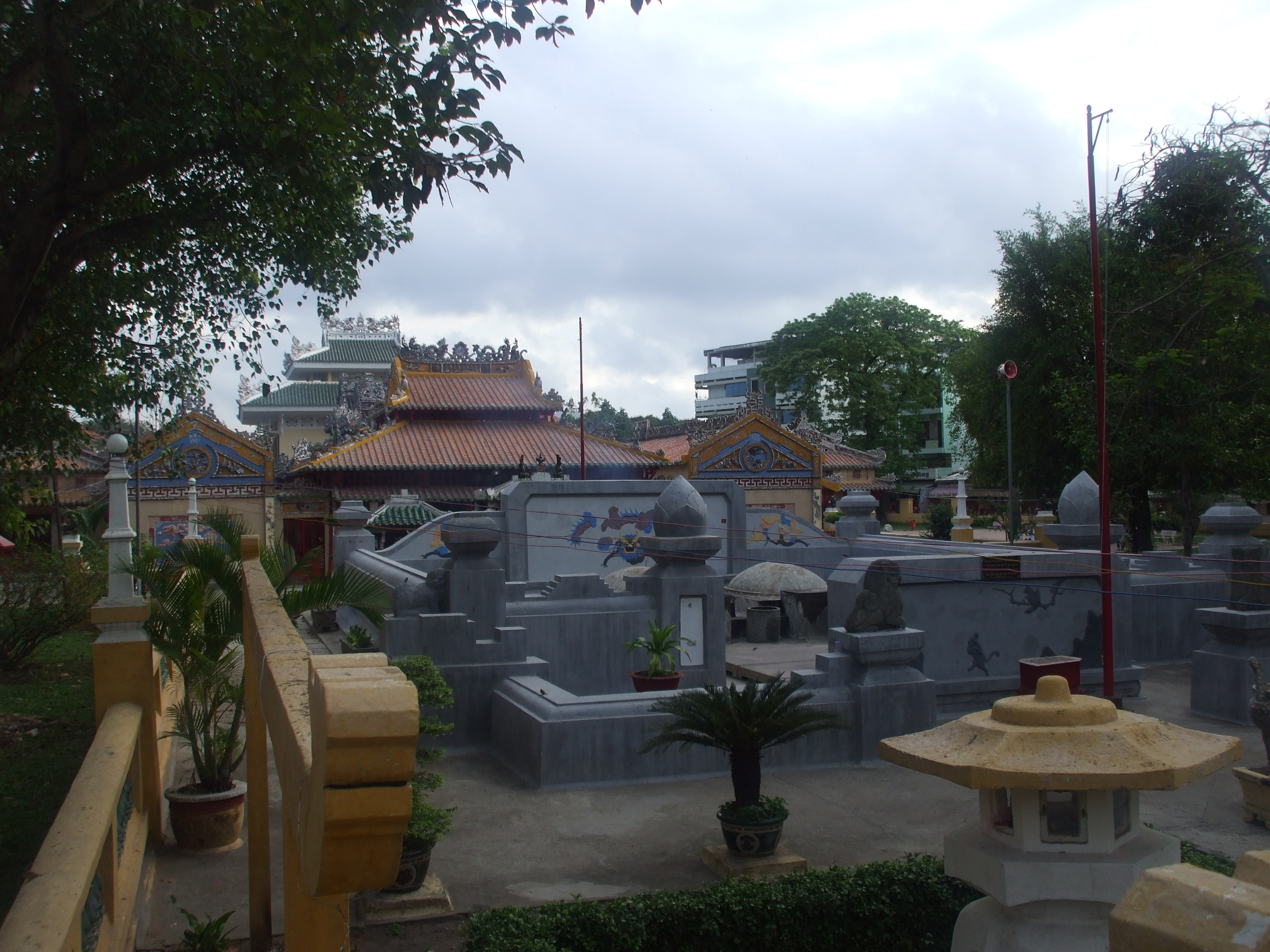
Grave of Lê Văn Duyệt and his wife in 2008.

After the establishment of the colony of Cochinchina, Duyet was continuously venerated in spite of the French policies of dismantling the Vietnamese imperial system and its ritual customs. Duyet's yearly celebrations was attended by politicians of Cochinchina. In 1937, thank to the donations from number of colonial government officials and business elites, Duyet's tomb was renovated and extended. Under South Vietnam's rule, Duyệt was considered as national greatest hero. After the fall of Saigon in 1975, Duyệt was disliked by the current government because of his role in the expansion of French influence in Vietnam and his tomb got dilapidated because of the lack of state maintenance. This attitude remained unchanged until the year 2008, when the current government had Duyệt's tomb renovated and let a play portraying the life of Duyet be performed publicly.

Nevertheless, Duyệt is widely regarded by southern Vietnamese people as the local most important hero. Choi Byung Wook described Duyet's popularity as following: "No matter whether they are indigenous Vietnamese or Chinese settlers, Buddhists or Christians, residents of Saigon have long paid enthusiastic tribute to one favorite southern, local hero—Lê Văn Duyệt—whose gorgeous shrine is located on Le Van Duyet street in Binh Thanh District. You will not able to find any other place in Huế or Hanoi where the residents, regardless of ethnic or religious backgrounds, regard their own local hero with such reverence".

== Notes ==
Citations
