= Lê Chất =

Vietnamese general (d. 1826)

Lê Chất 黎質
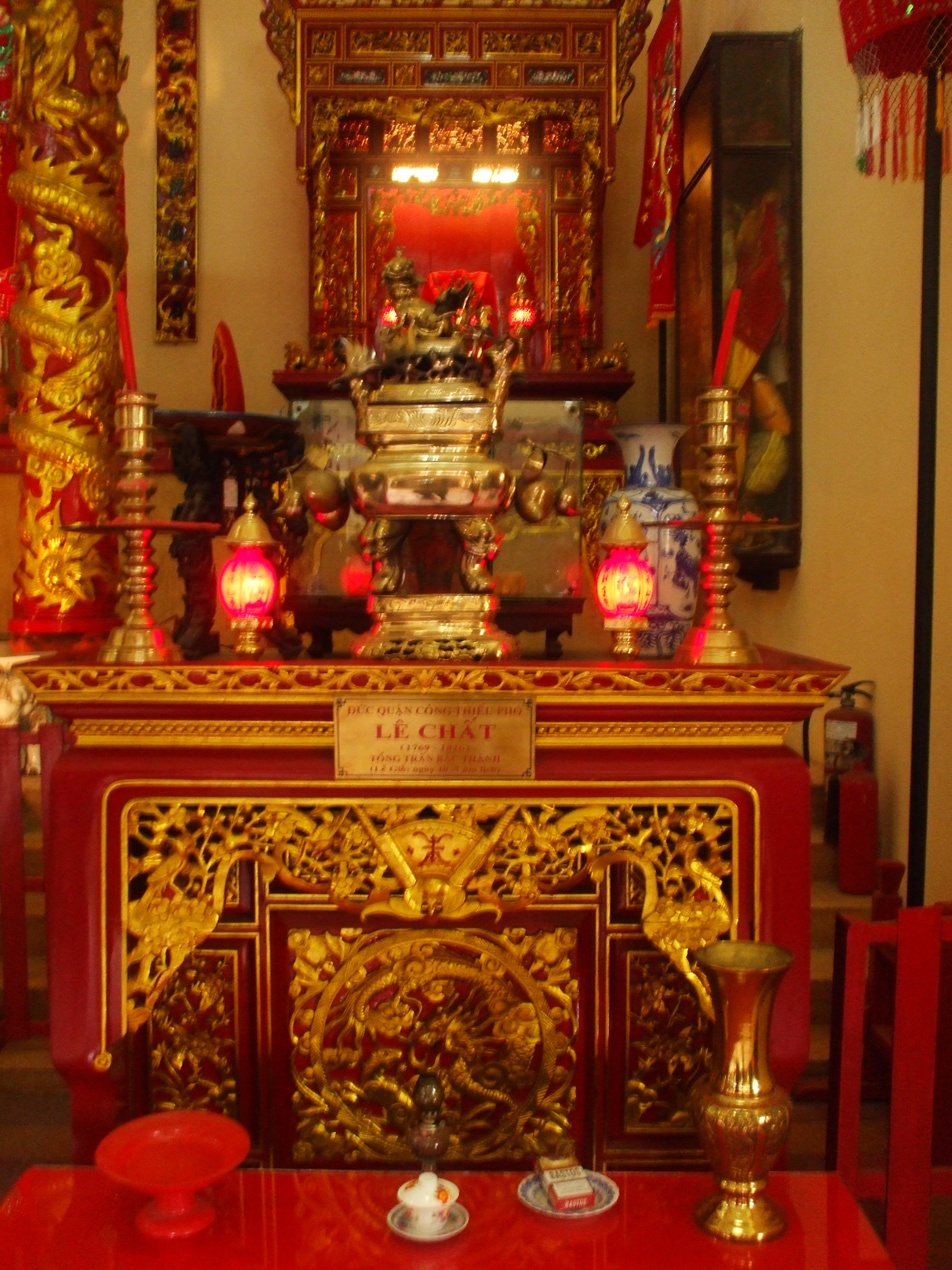
- Bronze statue of Lê Chất in Lăng Ông Bà Chiểu.
- Born: 1769 or 1774; Phù Mỹ District, Bình Định Province, Vietnam
- Died: 1826; Thăng Long (modern Hanoi), Vietnam
- Burial place: Hanoi
- Relatives: Lê Trung (father-in-law)
- Military career
- Allegiance: Tây Sơn dynasty Nguyễn lords Nguyễn dynasty
- Rank: General
- Conflicts: The Naval Battle of Thi Nai (1801)

Lê Chất (chữ Hán: 黎質, ?–1826), also known as Lê Văn Chất (黎文質), Lê Tông Chất (黎宗質) or Lê Công Chất (黎公質), was a general of Tây Sơn dynasty. Later he became a general of Nguyễn dynasty.

== Early life ==
Lê Chất was born in Phù Mỹ District, Bình Định Province. He was a son-in-law of Lê Trung. He served as Đại Đô đốc (大都督, "Grand Chief Controller") in Tây Sơn dynasty. After the death of Emperor Quang Trung, Chất prophesied that the Tây Sơn dynasty would soon decline and tried to persuade Lê Trung to surrender to Nguyễn lord several times. But Trung hesitated.

In 1798, Lê Trung was purged by Emperor Cảnh Thịnh. He had to surrender to the Nguyễn lord. He was appointed hậu quân tướng quân ("general of the rear army") by Gia Long.

== Career ==
Chất played an important role in the pacification of the Tây Sơn dynasty. He was ordered to build Imperial City of Huế together with Phạm Văn Nhân and Nguyễn Văn Khiêm in 1803.

In 1810, Chất was appointed Assistant Viceroy of Bắc Thành (Hiệp tổng trấn Bắc Thành) and became the assistant of Nguyễn Huỳnh Đức.

He was elevated to viceroy in 1818. Bắc Thành dư địa chí, an official geographical record of Tonkin, was compiled during his term.

== Legacy ==
He died in 1826, and was granted the position thiếu phó ("Junior Tutor") posthumously, and received the posthumous name Trung Nghị (忠毅).

Chất was accused by Lê Bá Tú in 1836. Minh Mạng's tomb was desecrated and had a stele with the inscription "chỗ nầy là nơi Lê Chất phục pháp" ("Here lies Lê Chất who resisted the law") placed over the ruins. His body was dug out and decapitated. His four sons: Lê Cẩn, Lê Trương, Lê Thường and Lê Kỵ, were beheaded.

In 1847, Emperor Tự Đức gave him a royal pardon. He was rehabilitated in 1868. He was worshipped at Lăng Ông Bà Chiểu ("Tomb of the Marshal in Ba Chieu") together with Lê Văn Duyệt and Phan Thanh Giản.

In 1910, the colonial government dug road from Quán Thánh Temple to Residence of the Governor-General to supply electricity. The workers found the tomb of Lê Chất accidentally. Later, his remains were reburied beside Hanoi Zoo.

Hậu Quân Chất Street in Hanoi was named after him during the French colonial period. The street was renamed to Mai Xuân Thưởng Street after th August Revolution.

Political offices
Preceded by none post created	Assistant Viceroy of Bắc Thành; 1810–1819	Succeeded by Nguyễn Hữu Thận
Preceded by Nguyễn Huỳnh Đức	Viceroy of Bắc Thành; 1819–1826	Succeeded by none Viceroy's post abolished
