= Trương Tấn Bửu =

Vietnamese general (1752–1827)

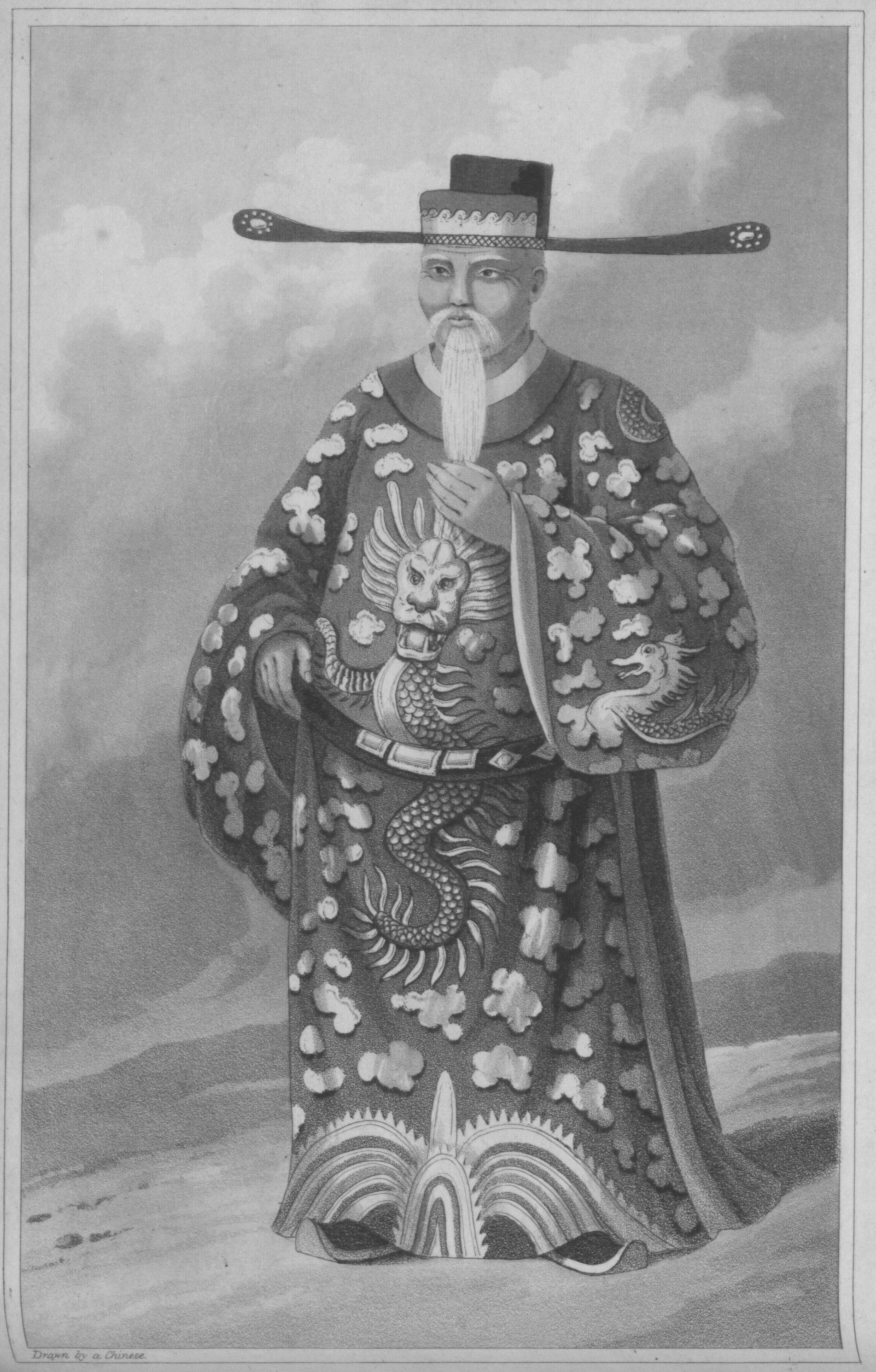
Deputy Governor of Kamboja in his dress of ceremony by John Crawfurd book Published by H Colburn London 1828

Trương Tấn Bửu (張進寶, 1752–1827), also called Trương Tấn Long (張進隆), was a general and official of the Nguyễn dynasty of Vietnam.

He was born in 1752 in Thạch Phú Đông, Giồng Trôm District, Bến Tre Province. In 1797, he joined the army of Nguyễn Ánh and became a đốc chiêu cai cơ (commander). Later, he became the Deputy Marshal of the Nguyễn's Army's Front Division. In 1802, after the unification of Vietnam, he became the military commander of Nguyen's armies in northern Vietnam and later the Viceroy of Bắc Thành. In 1816, he became the Deputy Marshal of the Nguyễn Army's Central Division which guarding Huế, the capital of Nguyễn dynasty. In 1823, he took up the post of Viceroy of Gia Định replacing Lê Văn Duyệt. Shortly thereafter, he retired because of illness and then died in 1827 at the age of 75.

== In popular culture ==
Trương Tấn Bửu, along with Nguyễn Văn Trương, Nguyễn Văn Nhơn, Lê Văn Duyệt, and Nguyễn Huỳnh Đức have been counted as Nguyễn Ánh's Ngũ hổ tướng ("Five Tiger Generals").
