= Chaux-lès-Passavant =

- Commune
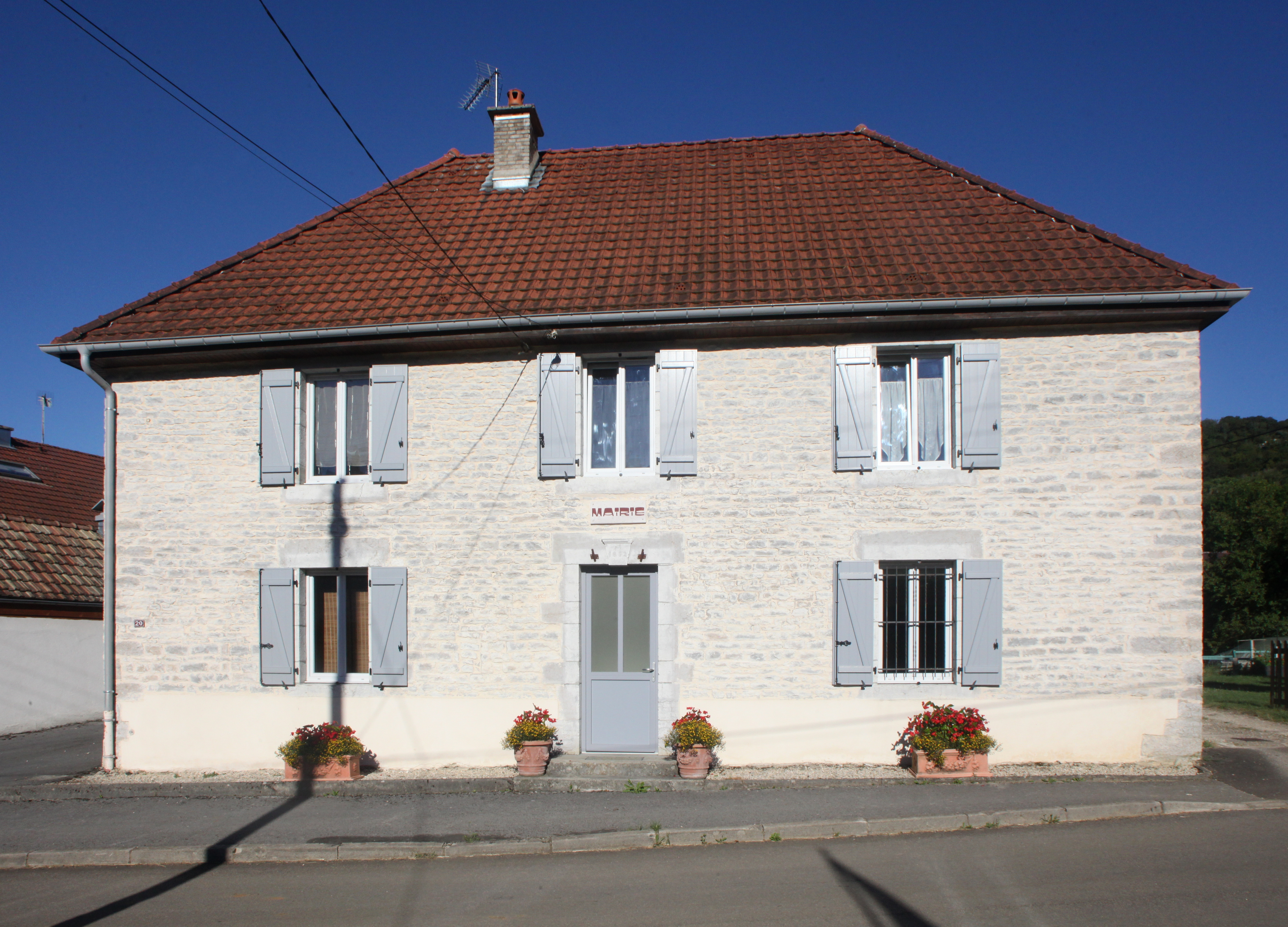
- The town hall in Chaux-lès-Passavant
- Location of Chaux-lès-Passavant
- Location within France Location within Bourgogne-Franche-Comté
- Coordinates: 47°14′12″N 6°21′33″E
- Country: France
- Region: Bourgogne-Franche-Comté
- Department: Doubs
- Arrondissement: Pontarlier
- Canton: Valdahon

Government
  - Mayor (2020–2026): Gérard Jacquin
- Area^{1}: 8.44 km^{2} (3.26 sq mi)
- Highest elevation: 639 m (2,096 ft)
- Lowest elevation: 420 m (1,380 ft)
- Population (2023): 124
  - Density: 14.7/km^{2} (38.1/sq mi)
- Time zone: UTC+01:00 (CET)
  - Summer (DST): UTC+02:00 (CEST)
- INSEE/Postal code: 25141 /25530
- ^{1} French Land Register data, which excludes lakes, ponds, glaciers > 1 km^{2} (0.386 sq mi or 247 acres) and river estuaries.

Chaux-lès-Passavant (French pronunciation: [ʃo lɛ pasavɑ̃], literally Chaux near Passavant) is a commune in the Doubs department in the Bourgogne-Franche-Comté region in eastern France.

== Population ==
Historical population
Year	Pop.	±% p.a.
1968	192	—
1975	164	−2.23%
1982	154	−0.89%
1990	137	−1.45%
1999	144	+0.56%
2007	148	+0.34%
2012	146	−0.27%
2017	133	−1.85%
2023	124	−1.16%
Source: INSEE

== See also ==
- Passavant
- Communes of the Doubs department
