= Joseph Marchand =

French missionary in Vietnam (1803–1835)

Saint Joseph Marchand
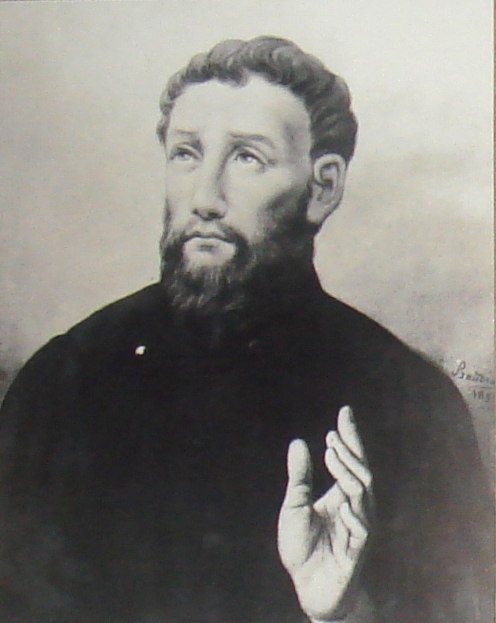
- Posthumous portrait

Martyr
- Born: 17 August 1803; Passavant, French Republic
- Died: 30 November 1835 (aged 32); Huế, Vietnam
- Beatified: 27 May 1900
- Canonized: 19 June 1988 by Pope John Paul II
- Feast: 30 November; 24 November (with the Vietnamese Martyrs)

Joseph Marchand (17 August 1803 – 30 November 1835) was a French missionary in Vietnam and a member of the Paris Foreign Missions Society. He is now a Catholic saint, celebrated on 30 November.

== Personal life ==
Marchand was born in Passavant, in the Doubs department of France. At the age of 25, he joined the Paris Foreign Mission with the primary goal of evangelizing countries in Asia.

== Vietnam ==
Depiction of martyrdom

In 1833, he was invited to join the Lê Văn Khôi revolt led by Lê Văn Khôi, son of the late governor of southern Vietnam Lê Văn Duyệt. He vowed to overthrow Emperor Minh Mạng and replace him with My Duong, the son of Minh Mạng's late elder brother Nguyễn Phúc Cảnh, who were both Catholics. Khoi appealed to other Catholics to join in overthrowing Minh Mạng and installing a Catholic emperor. They quickly seized the Citadel of Saigon in an uprising lasting two years.

In 1835, he was arrested for supposedly having been associated with the rebellion and later executed in Huế, becoming a Catholic martyr after having his flesh pulled from his bones by tongs, known as death by a thousand cuts.

Pope Gregory XVI spoke of Marchand's "courage as a champion of Christ" in 1840, and he was canonized by Pope John Paul II in 1988. His feast day is 30 November and his joint feast day with the Vietnamese Martyrs is 24 November.

== See also ==
- Vietnamese Martyrs
