= Bạch Xuân Nguyên =

Vietnamese official (died 1833)

Bạch Xuân Nguyên (白春元, died 1833) was an official of the Nguyễn dynasty of Vietnam.

After the death of Lê Văn Duyệt, the viceroy of southern Vietnam in 1832, the emperor Minh Mạng, who was involved in a power struggle with Duyệt, appointed Nguyễn to investigate the viceroy's administration.

Nguyễn led the investigation, and concluded that Duyet and his entourage had engaged in corruption and abuse of power. He ordered the posthumous humiliation of Duyệt. This resulted in the desecration of his tomb, the execution of sixteen relatives, and the arrests of his colleagues. This led Duyệt's adopted son Lê Văn Khôi to break out of prison and revolt against the emperor. One of his first actions was to execute Nguyễn.
