= Passavant, Doubs =

Passavant
- Commune
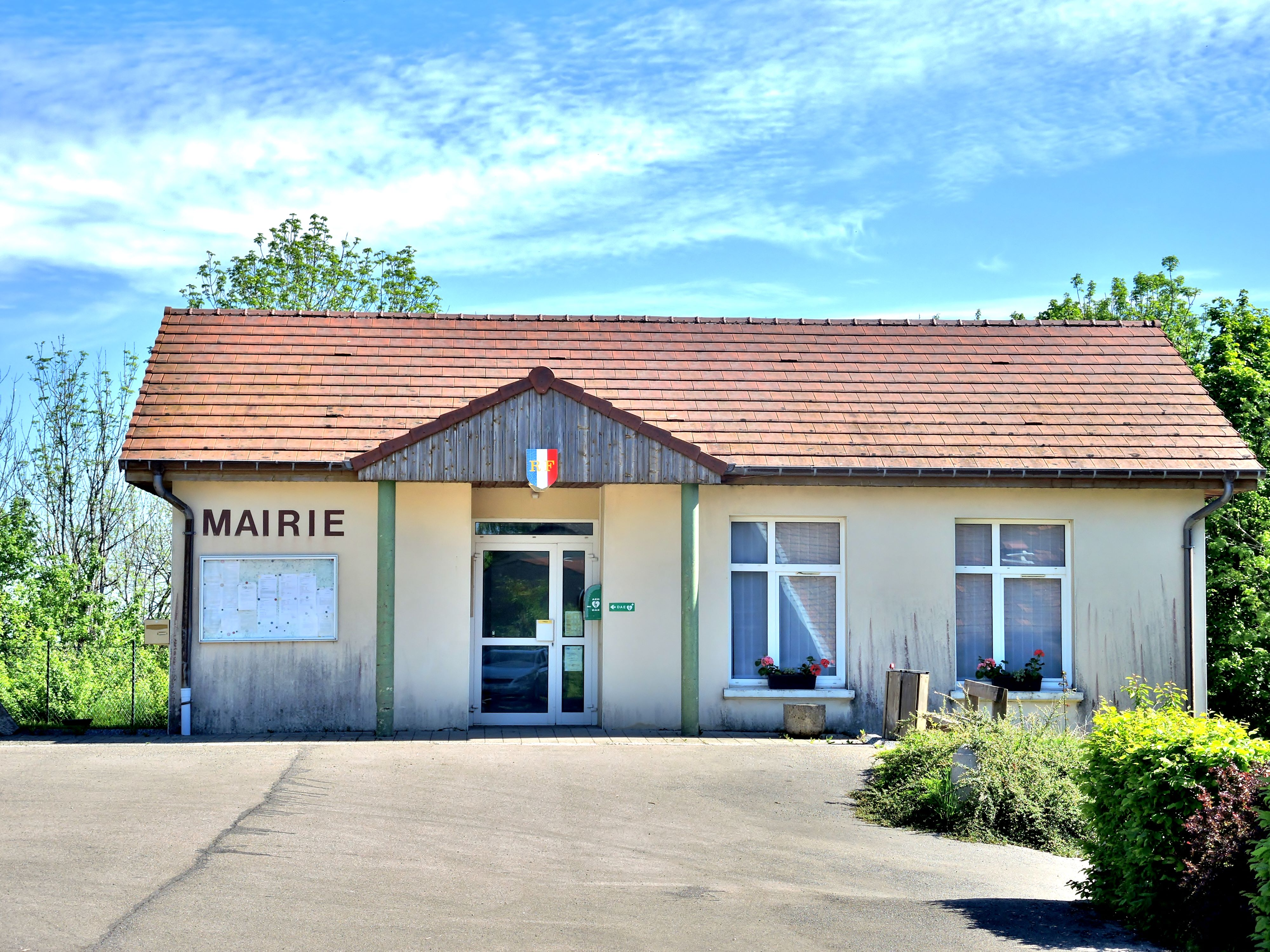
- The town hall in Passavant
- Location of Passavant
- Location within France Location within Bourgogne-Franche-Comté
- Coordinates: 47°16′32″N 6°23′03″E
- Country: France
- Region: Bourgogne-Franche-Comté
- Department: Doubs
- Arrondissement: Besançon
- Canton: Baume-les-Dames

Government
  - Mayor (2020–2026): Richard Mariaz
- Area^{1}: 14.98 km^{2} (5.78 sq mi)
- Highest elevation: 697 m (2,287 ft)
- Lowest elevation: 489 m (1,604 ft)
- Population (2023): 191
  - Density: 12.8/km^{2} (33.0/sq mi)
- Time zone: UTC+01:00 (CET)
  - Summer (DST): UTC+02:00 (CEST)
- INSEE/Postal code: 25446 /25360
- ^{1} French Land Register data, which excludes lakes, ponds, glaciers > 1 km^{2} (0.386 sq mi or 247 acres) and river estuaries.

Passavant (French pronunciation: [pasavɑ̃]) is a commune in the Doubs département in the Bourgogne-Franche-Comté region in eastern France.

== Population ==
Historical population
Year	Pop.	±% p.a.
1968	213	—
1975	191	−1.55%
1982	171	−1.57%
1990	198	+1.85%
1999	188	−0.57%
2007	200	+0.78%
2012	236	+3.37%
2017	217	−1.66%
2023	191	−2.10%
Source: INSEE

== Personalities ==
- Joseph Marchand

== See also ==
- Communes of the Doubs department
