= Lê Văn Duyệt =

Vietnamese general (1763/64–1832)

Lê Văn Duyệt 黎文悅
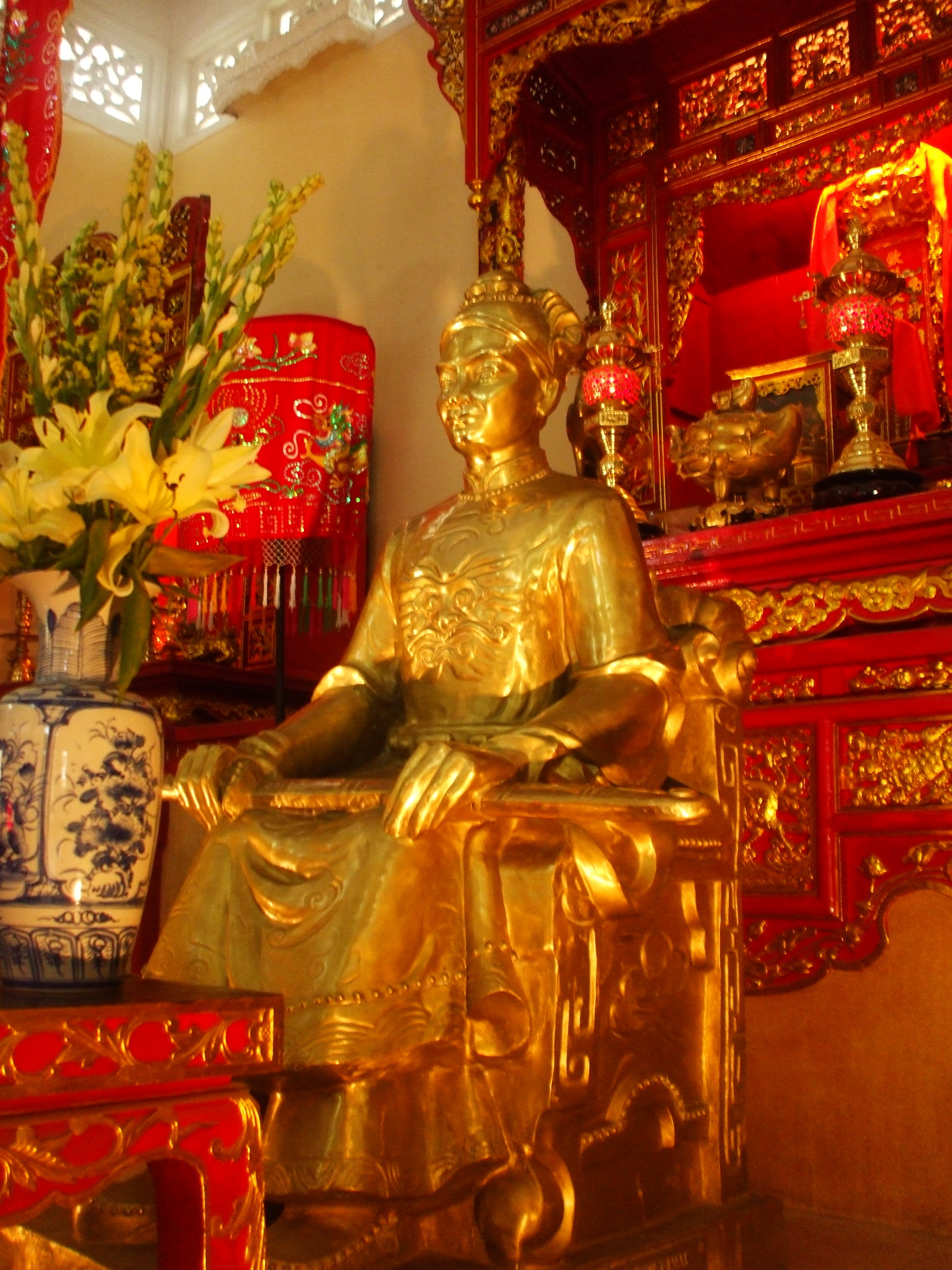
- Bronze statue of Lê Văn Duyệt in his tomb
- Born: 1763 or 1764; Trà Lọt, Hòa Khánh, Định Tường, Đàng Trong
- Died: 30 July 1832 (aged 68); Gia Định, Vietnam
- Burial place: Tomb of Lê Văn Duyệt, Ho Chi Minh City
- Military career
- Allegiance: Nguyễn lords Nguyễn dynasty
- Service years: 1789–1832
- Rank: General
- Conflicts: Naval Battle of Thi Nai (1801); Battle of Quảng Nghĩa (1803); Cambodian rebellion (1811–1812); Campaign against Đá Vách (1816–1817); Cambodian rebellion (1820)

Lê Văn Duyệt (Note: In Thai record, he was called Ong Ta Kun (Thai: องต๋ากุน).) (1763 or 1764 – 30 July 1832) was a Vietnamese general who helped Nguyễn Ánh—the future Emperor Gia Long—put down the Tây Sơn wars, unify Vietnam and establish the Nguyễn dynasty. After the Nguyễn came to power in 1802, Duyệt became a high-ranking mandarin, serving under the first two Nguyễn emperors Gia Long and Minh Mạng.

Born into a family of peasants in what is today's Đồng Tháp, Duyệt joined Prince Nguyễn Ánh in fighting the Tây Sơn peasant rebellion. Because of Duyệt's military ability, he quickly rose through the ranks of the Nguyễn army and became a marshal when the hostilities ended. After the foundation of the Nguyễn dynasty, Duyệt served as a high-ranking mandarin and, later, viceroy of the southern part of Vietnam, ruling from Gia Định (modern-day Saigon).

His governance greatly stabilized and helped develop the southern Vietnam, turning it into a wealthy and peaceful region. In addition, Duyệt opposed Emperor Minh Mạng's ascension and defended Christian missionaries and converts from the emperor's isolationist and Confucian policies. These attitudes brought Duyệt into conflict with Minh Mạng and led to the posthumous desecration of Duyệt's tomb, which provoked his adopted son Lê Văn Khôi to revolt against the court the following year in 1833. Later, Emperors Thiệu Trị and Tự Đức, son and grandson of Minh Mạng, rehabilitated the general's honor and restored his tomb.

== Early life ==
Lê Văn Duyệt was born in either 1763 or 1764 in Định Tường (present day Đồng Tháp), a quaint part of the Mekong Delta, in southern Vietnam. His parents were peasants whose ancestors came from Quảng Ngãi in central Vietnam during the southwards expansion of the Nguyễn Lords. Duyệt was born in a poor family, and he tended buffaloes during his childhood. Attracted by the possibilities of the "New South", the family then moved to Gia Định.

== General of Nguyễn Ánh ==
In 1780, Duyệt became a eunuch (Note: Although Duyệt was not a true eunuch, he was born intersex.) of the 18-year-old Prince Nguyễn Ánh, the nephew of the slain Nguyễn Lord and the most senior member of the family who survived the revolt by the three Tây Sơn brothers, who seized power in southern Vietnam from the Nguyễn in 1777. As a result, Nguyễn Ánh and a few loyalists fled into the dense jungles of the Mekong Delta in the far south. Later, Nguyễn Ánh made Duyệt a Cai Cơ ("Commander") of his bodyguards. From 1777 onwards, the military balance between the Tây Sơn and the Nguyễn fluctuated, as the forces came in conflict with each other frequently.

In 1782, the Tây Sơn attacked Gia Định again and forced Nguyễn Ánh to flee to the island of Phú Quốc under Duyệt's escort. It was one of many times when Gia Định changed hands. In 1787, Duyệt began organizing and commanding his own unit, and individually recruiting his own men. In 1788, the balance shifted in favor of the Nguyễn following the involvement of Pigneau de Behaine, a French Catholic priest who supported Nguyễn Ánh and helped recruit French military officers, partly motivated by the hope of securing future privileges for Catholicism. In 1788, the Nguyễn recaptured Gia Định and never relinquished it again. From then on, Nguyễn Ánh transformed the city into a fortress and his powerbase and began consolidating his hold on surrounding areas, before attacking the Tây Sơn with a view to eliminate them.

In 1789, Nguyễn Ánh made Duyệt a general. From this point on, Duyệt accompanied his lord on military campaigns against the Tây Sơn. Continuous warfare then ensued, mostly centred near Nha Trang and Qui Nhơn on the south central coast, where the Nguyễn besieged the Tây Sơn's strongholds.

In 1801, Duyệt engineered a naval victory in Thị Nại, which was a turning point of the war and heralded the complete collapse of the Tây Sơn. In the same year, a close colleague, Tong Viet Phuc was killed in battle by the Tây Sơn, this reportedly provoked Duyệt into a state of extreme anger, during which he killed enemy soldiers indiscriminately, prompting a rebuke from Nguyễn Ánh. Shortly thereafter, Nguyễn Ánh exploited the absence of most of the Tây Sơn's army, which was attempting to recapture Quy Nhon, to lead his army in an attack on Phú Xuân, the capital of the Tây Sơn. However, the Nguyễn encountered heavy resistance from Tây Sơn forces around the Tu Dung sea gate, the entrance into the citadel of Phú Xuân. Seeing that the Nguyễn forces could not breach the defense by frontal attacks, Nguyễn Ánh ordered Duyet to lead a naval division to attack the Tây Sơn defense complex from the rear. Lê Văn Duyệt and his deputy Le Chat then defeated the Tây Sơn army and forced their commander, Prince Consort Nguyen Van Tri, to flee. This paved a way for the Nguyễn to assault the citadel of Phú Xuân.

In 1802, Nguyễn Ánh, who had declared himself Emperor Gia Long after capturing Phú Xuân (Huế), appointed Duyệt to the position of Khâm Sai Chưởng Tả Quân Dinh Bình Tây Tướng Quân ("Marshal of King's Left Division, Tây Sơn Pacification General") and ordered him to attack Tây Sơn-controlled northern Vietnam. In October 1802, Duyệt captured the north, and then renamed it from Bắc Hà ("Northern River") to Bắc Thành ("Northern Citadel") thus marking ultimate victory of the Nguyễn against the Tây Sơn.

Duyệt's strategy, along with the French military tactics and technology recruited by Pigneau, played an important role in Nguyễn Ánh's success and the foundation of the Nguyễn dynasty.

== Mandarin of the Nguyễn dynasty ==
From 1802 to 1812, Duyệt served as a high-ranking general in the new imperial capital Huế in Annam (central Vietnam). In 1812, Emperor Gia Long appointed Duyệt as the viceroy of Gia Định. At this time, the viceroy of Gia Định held jurisdiction not only over Cochinchina (southern Vietnam) but also over Cambodia. (Note: When Vietnam fell into civil war during the period of the Tây Sơn rebellion, Cambodia was a vassal of Siam. After the foundation of the Nguyễn dynasty, Cambodia became a tributary of Vietnam at the request of the Cambodian king Ang Chan and the viceroy of Gia Định would hold jurisdiction over Cambodia on behalf of the Nguyễn emperors.)

The post of viceroy had significant powers; although no precise description of the head of Gia Định's responsibilities survives to this day, the rights of his northern counterpart included the power "...to decide lawsuits; and to appoint and dismiss officials at his own will. It is enough only to report to the court after acting at his own discretion." Gia Long trusted Duyệt and his fellow southerners; all of the viceroy's lheading deputies were locally bred men, whereas many of those who ran the north were not. This allowed Duyệt and his entourage to develop a strong support base with the grassroots population and gave them more gravitas with which to rule. He also tried to expand the support base for the Nguyễn in the south by appointing newly arrived Chinese refugees who had fled their homeland after the fall of the Ming dynasty as well as former rebels and bandits, to administrative posts if they were qualified, and encouraging their integration into and participation in society. Under the system of the time, military governors such as Duyệt moved to different posts with individual units that they had commanded for years, so he could count on their fidelity.

In 1812, a Siamese-supported young brother of Ang Chan, the King of Cambodia, rose up and seized the throne, which forced the incumbent to flee to Gia Định. In 1813, Duyệt, with the approval of Gia Long, entered Cambodia with an army of 10,000 troops and forced the Siamese army to retreat. He reinstated Ang Chan and built two citadels, Nam Vang and La Liem (Note: These names as written in Vietnamese sources.) on Cambodian territory in order to maintain Vietnamese jurisdiction over the nation, which was formally made a protectorate, adding to his prestige. In addition, Duyet's domestic governance was effective and stabilized the south, which prompted the people to give him the sobriquet Cọp Gấm Đồng Nai ("White Tiger of Đồng Nai"). As Gia Long's most trusted mandarin, Duyệt often acted as a conduit between the emperor and the European merchants and government delegates who visited Vietnam. In the early 1820s, Duyet dispatched a delegation to seek out British officials in an attempt to buy arms, but the party got lost in storms and were arrested after washing up in Burma. Duyet remained an advocate of hawkish foreign policy after the protectorate over Cambodia was entrenched, advocating an alliance with Burma against Siam, and expressing confidence that Vietnam could defeat Siam and dominate Southeast Asia.

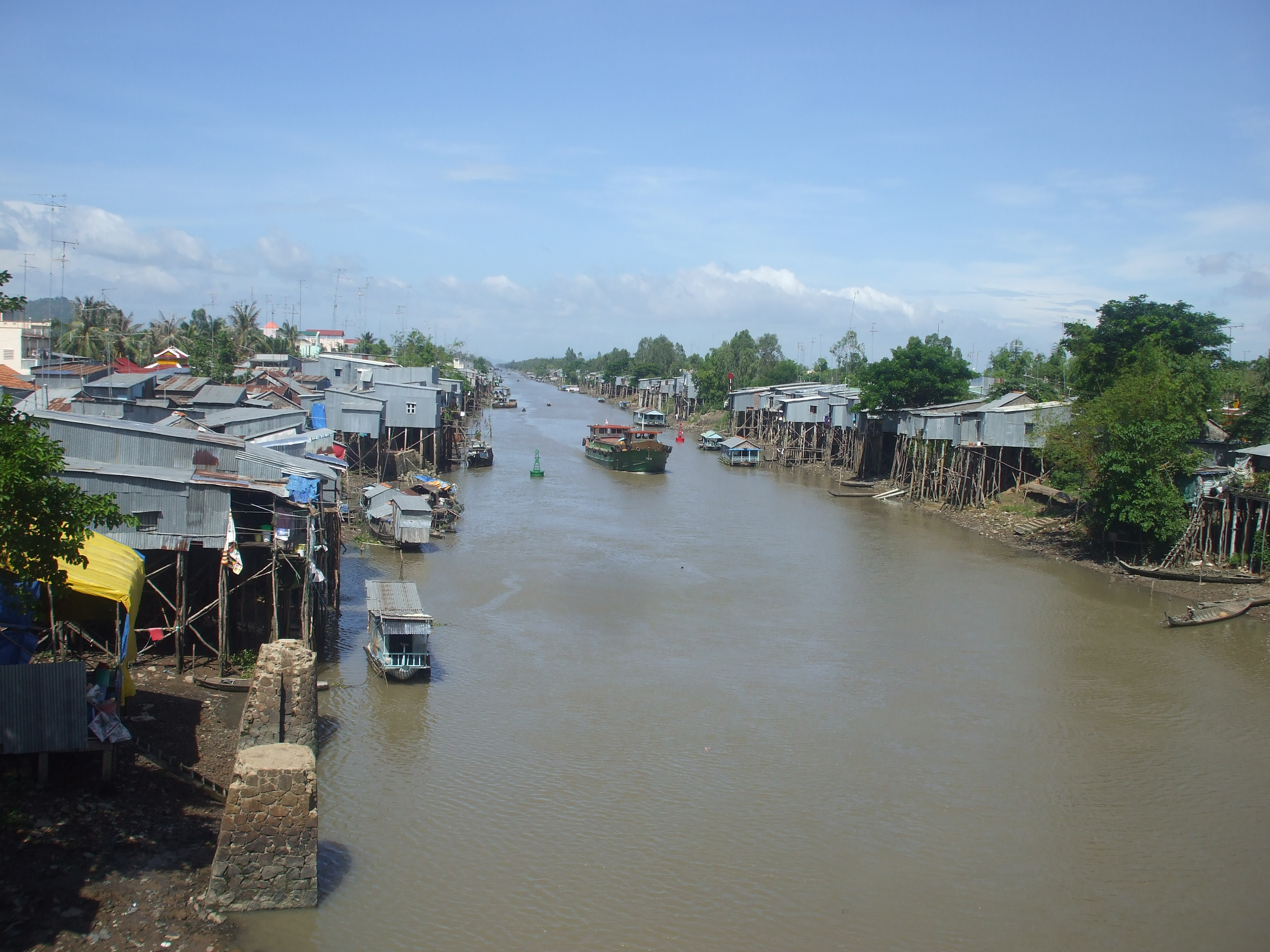
Vĩnh Tế Canal (10.570°N 104.926°E), an important canal in southern Vietnam which was completed in 1823 under Lê Văn Duyệt's supervision.

In 1815, Emperor Gia Long summoned him back in order to suppress widespread rebellions in central Vietnam. In 1819, Duyệt was in Nghệ An and Thanh Hóa in northern Vietnam putting down revolts for Gia Long. During this time, he joined forces with a former rebel leader from a highlands minority group in Cao Bằng. This man became Duyệt's adopted son under the name Lê Văn Khôi and his men also rallied to the court. Khoi was then propelled directly into a high-ranking post in Gia Định. During the final four years of Gia Long's reign, Duyệt ascended to the highest rank in the court, and he and Pham Dang Hung, another southerner, were the only people present as the emperor died. Gia Long decreed that Duyệt take command of five royal regiments.

After pacifying central Vietnam, Duyệt was reappointed to be the viceroy of southern Vietnam and Cambodia in 1820 by Emperor Minh Mạng, Gia Long's successor. The emperor further enhanced Duyệt's powers by allowing him the power to oversee all foreign trade coming into his area, and collect taxes in Cambodia and on imports and exports at his discretion. This gave Duyệt control over the vast economic resources in the fertile agricultural and lumber-rich region and most importantly, land development. The southern area had only been populated by ethnic Vietnamese in recent centuries and immigration, clearing and development of land was rapid.

At the beginning of his second period as viceroy, Duyệt suppressed a revolt of the local Khmer people and enlisted ten thousand new taxpayers, thereby generating a large new revenue source for the court. He supervised the renovation of the Vĩnh Tế Canal, an important waterway in southern Vietnam. Moreover, Duyệt was successful in suppressing unrest and criminal activity, and increasing foreign trade in southern Vietnam and Cambodia . Duyệt's works greatly stabilized and developed southern Vietnam, turning it into a wealthy and peaceful region. As recognition for Duyệt's service, Minh Mạng rewarded Duyệt with a belt made of jade—a prestigious gift in the Confucian system usually given to an emperor as a tribute, or by a monarch to an official to honour a great service—and betrothed a princess to Duyệt's adopted son as a wife.

Duyệt was also involved in internal palace machinations. He became involved in a bitter rivalry with General Nguyen Van Thanh, the viceroy of northern Vietnam and commander of the Center Division; Thanh was another of Gia Long's leading generals. Duyệt was assisted in this dispute by Nguyen Huu Nghi, who had been a former confidant of Thanh before defecting. Later, another soldier who had served Thanh was caught mingling in Duyệt's military camp and was captured. Duyệt claimed that the man confessed to being sent by Thanh to assassinate him.

On another hand, Duyệt was the mandarin who charged former Crown Prince Cảnh's wife for having an incestuous relationship with her eldest son and then executed her by drowning in 1824. Duyệt's action effectively ended the claim to Vietnam's throne by Prince Cảnh's descendants. According to one report however, Minh Mạng had already been informed from another quarter of the affair. Choi Byung Wook, a Korean historian, described this event as a "most dramatic event illustrating Lê Văn Duyệt's loyalty to Minh Mạng".

== Conflict with Minh Mạng ==
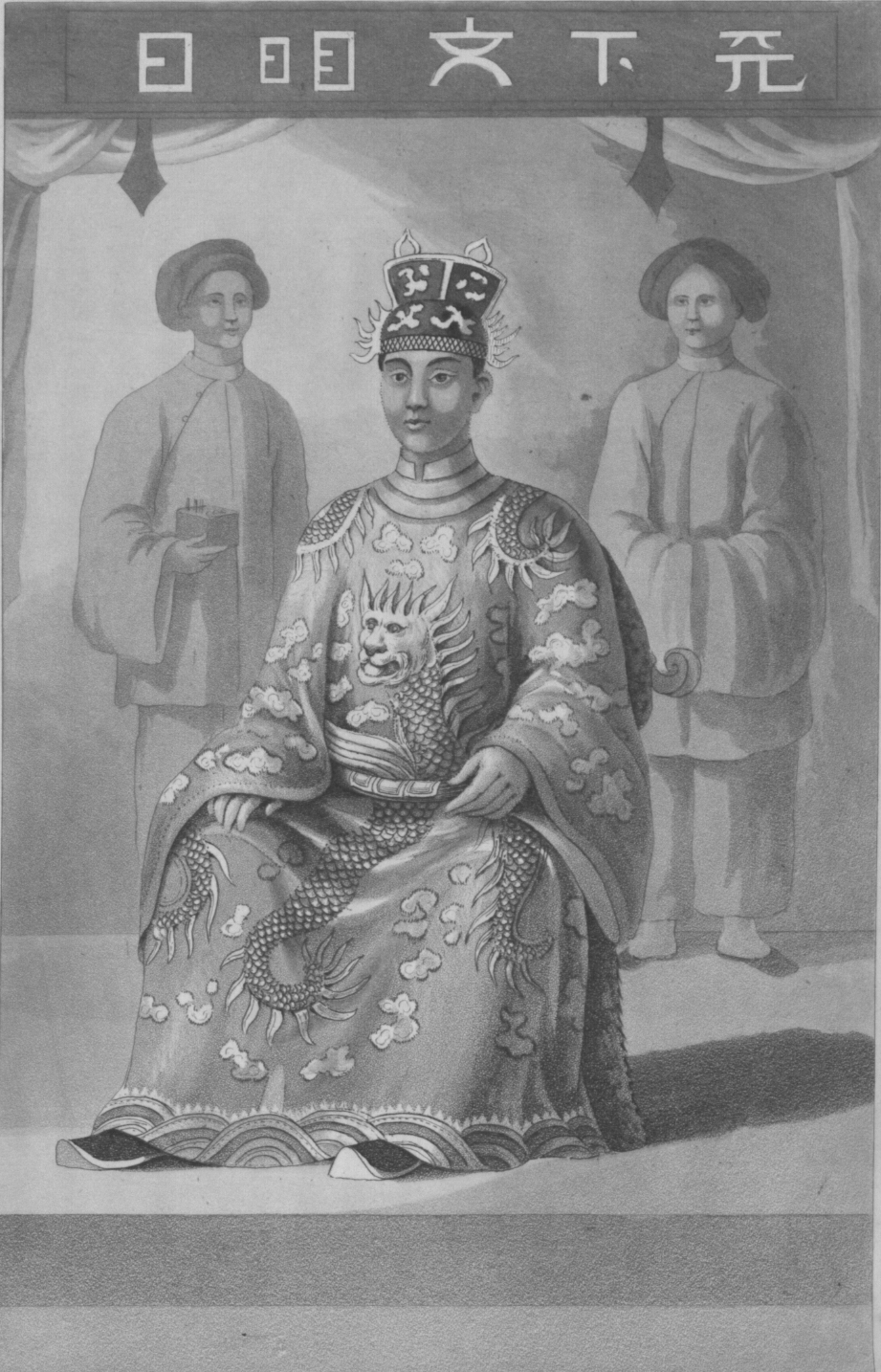
Minh Mạng, second Emperor of the Nguyễn dynasty.

There was a lot of tension between Duyet and Minh Mạng. Although Gia Long had enlisted European support to claim the throne and allowed missionaries to function in Vietnam in gratitude to Pigneau, he ran a classical Confucian administration. He also expressed dismay at the Catholic condemnation of the traditional ancestral worship, a basic tenet of Vietnamese culture; Crown Prince Cảnh had been converted by Pigneau and subsequently refused to bow down to his ancestors, instead desecrating a shrine with feces.

As Crown Prince Cảnh had died of smallpox during the war against the Tây Sơn, it was assumed that Cảnh's son would succeed Gia Long, but in 1816 Nguyễn Phúc Đảm, the son of Gia Long's second wife, was appointed instead. Gia Long chose him for his strong character and his deeply conservative aversion to Westerners, whereas Cảnh's lineage had converted to Catholicism and had shunned Confucian traditions such as ancestor worship. Gia Long told his son to treat the Europeans—especially the French—respectfully, but not to grant them any position of preponderance.

Minh Mạng disliked Duyệt because he was one of many high-ranking mandarins who opposed Gia Long's succession plan. Duyệt and many of his southern associates tended to be favourable to Christianity, and supported the installation of Nguyễn Phúc Cảnh's descendants. As a result, Duyệt was held in high regard by the Catholic community. Historian Mark McLeod said that "As the head of a region enjoying substantial autonomy, Lê Văn Duyệt had good reason to prefer that the empire be ruled after Gia-long's death by an immature or malleable monarch." According to McLeod, as Duyệt was not from a scholar-gentry background and lacked a classical Confucian education, he did not place a great emphasis on tradition and was more concerned with military needs, and that as a result, he would be more interested in maintaining strong relations with Europeans so that he could acquire weapons from them, rather than worrying about the social implications of Westernization. There was also speculation that Gia Long was worried that Cảnh's 18-year-old heir was too young and could have been manipulated, and that he would forget his Eastern roots, whereas the more mature Minh Mạng—aged 26—would not. Gia Long was aware of the fact that Catholic clergy were opposed to the installation of Minh Mạng.

Minh Mạng began to place restrictions on Catholicism. He enacted "edicts of interdiction of the Catholic religion" and condemned Christianity as a "heterodox doctrine". He saw the Catholics as a possible source of division, especially as the missionaries were arriving in Vietnam in ever-increasing numbers.

Because of the role of Westerners in the war between the Nguyễn and the Tây Sơn, and Pigneau's role in recruiting European assistance, Duyệt protected Vietnamese Catholic converts and Westerners from Minh Mạng's isolationalist and Confucian policies by disobeying the emperor's orders. In defense of the Christians, Duyệt wrote to Ming Mạng, "We still have between our teeth the rice which the missionaries gave us when we were starving." This came in response to an imperial edict that ordered missionaries to leave their areas of operation and move to the imperial city, ostensibly because the palace needed translators, but in reality to stop the Catholics from proselytizing. Whereas the government officials in central and northern Vietnam complied, Duyệt disobeyed the order and Minh Mạng was forced to bide his time. In the meantime, southern Christians were still publicly identifying themselves as such and praticising their beliefs without facing any obstacles from local officials. Choi said that "From the point of view of Minh Mạng and his men, the land of Gia Định was thoroughly sheltered by Lê Văn Duyệt's prestige."

Duyệt's policy towards criminals and former rebels also courted conflict with Minh Mạng. In the early-19th century, the nascent years of the Nguyễn dynasty were plagued by incessant revolts, particularly in northern and central Vietnam. This resulted in a large number of rebels being captured along with common criminals and bandits. Such people were usually internally exiled to the opposite part of the country, so a large number ended up in southern Vietnam. These included many former rebels who were spared the death penalty after being defeated by Duyệt in northern and central Vietnam during his pacification campaigns in the late 1810s, and had sworn loyalty towards the general personally. These men were sent south with their wives and children to remove them from potentially rebellious areas and to punish them, but another objective was to start military colonies to help develop southern Vietnam, which had only recently been acquired by ethnic Vietnamese. The convicts were given equipment to work on the land and some were later pardoned. Duyệt and Gia Long had employed surrendered Tây Sơn officers in positions of authority, and this policy had continued due a shortage of manpower until Minh Mạng came to power. Duyệt wanted to continue this policy and wrote to Minh Mạng for permission, but was rejected. The emperor replied that such a policy was "like releasing a monkey to climb up a tree". For Minh Mạng, the placement of former convicts and rebels in positions of power was contrary to the Confucian system of order and debauched the prestige of the state, whereas Duyet was only concerned with practicality.

During the 1820s, Duyệt's continued cultivated of relations with the immigrant Chinese community that had settled in southern Vietnam in large numbers brought him into conflict with Minh Mạng. The general had adopted a Chinese immigrant merchant as his son and gave him favours, including appointing him to position of the body that regulated trade. The Japanese historian Shimao concluded that Duyệt and his entourage were given financial rewards and gifts from the Chinese merchants in return for favourable treatment by government officials. It was also pointed out that another of Duyet's men was himself a businessman who had a Chinese agent. At the time, southern Vietnam was producing rice in plentiful quantities but export was banned by Minh Mạng, but prices in Vietnam, which were lower than those overseas, kept rising by 50–100% in various parts of the country in five years. In the meantime, the opium supply kept on increasing. It was thought that Chinese merchants, whom Duyệt patronised, were illegally exporting rice at higher prices, and then bringing back opium during return journeys along with incoming immigrants. For his part, the general disagreed with the prevailing view held by the emperor, and said that people of both races were engaging in illegal trading, as well as blaming the incoming immigrants' personal addictions rather than the Chinese merchants for bringing in opium. The historian Nola Cooke said that Duyet's viewpoint was more plausible and speculated that the emperor's stance was borne more out of a fear of the consequences of a disproportionate Chinese influence on the country than the reality of illegal trading. Duyệt wanted to further give tax concessions to newly arrived Chinese immigrants that were deemed to be impoverished to encourage immigration and speed up development of the region, something that the emperor was sceptical of, on the reasoning that it was difficult to genuinely determine who was in need and that the concession system was therefore open to rorting. Nevertheless, Duyệt disobeyed Minh Mạng and tax concessions were granted. Because of their involvement in the illegal exportation of rice and importation of opium, Minh Mạng tried to ban the Chinese from engaging in sea trade in 1827, but this was easily circumvented by the merchants, who exploited their contacts with Duyệt and used fraudulent registrations, often under the name of Vietnamese wives. It was not until Duyệt died that Minh Mạng was able to crack down on fraudulent sea trade.

For a time, Duyệt's attitude and stature in the south forced Minh Mạng to moderate his policies and allow the preaching of Christian missionaries. However, it also increased the tension between the pair and Minh Mạng was anxious to curtail the autonomy that his father had granted to Duyệt and the southerners. The emperor began to slowly wind back their military powers, in an attempt to wear down Duyệt's power base by gradually removing the general's close aides.

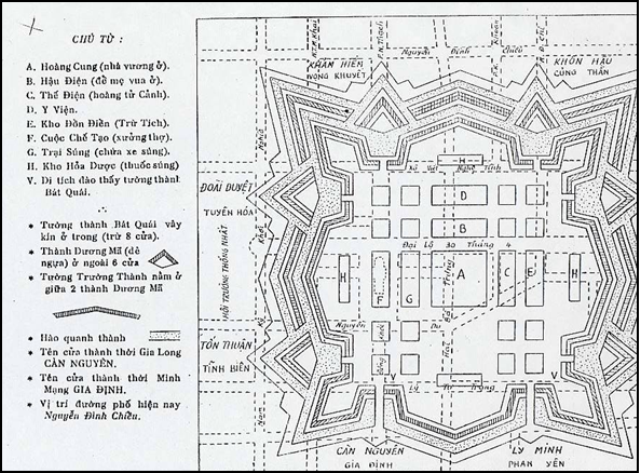
Layout of the original citadel. Before 1835, the citadel of Saigon was also called Thành Bát Quái (Citadel of Eight Trigrams) or Thành Quy (Citadel of Tortoise) because of this layout.

In 1821, Minh Mạng sent two of his aides from central Vietnam to serve as education officials in the south. One of the objectives was that they would oversee the imperial examination process and education system, which would allow them to determine who would serve in the government as mandarins and therefore fill the southern ranks with men acceptable to the court. However, their attempts were either blocked or circumvented by Duyệt's incumbent officials and they returned to the capital two years later in failure. In 1823, one of Duyệt's closest subordinates Tran Nhat Vinh, was indicted by one of Minh Mạng's officials from Huế, who charged him with trading rice on the black market and operating a brothel. Duyệt put a stop to the legal proceedings and angrily tried to turn the tables, calling on the emperor to execute the accusing official. This ended in a stalemate, but a few years later, Vinh was transferred to northern Vietnam and later imprisoned while Duyet was unable to do anything about the matter in the south; Vinh's position was taken by one of the emperor's men. In 1826, Duyệt resisted the removal of a regional official by the palace, leading the emperor to criticise him in a proclamation declaring that court appointments came under the purview of Huế. The following year, Duyệt executed convicted criminals without informing the capital, leading the emperor to criticise him again, saying that "the ultimate authority to decide questions of life and death belongs to the court."

In 1829, Duyet suffered another blow when Nguyen Van Thoai, an ally whom he appointed to run Cambodia for him died. The general nominated another subordinate to replace his colleague Nguyen Van Xuan, but Minh Mạng overruled him and instead appointed one of his mandarins Bui Minh Duc to the post. Although the emperor formally asked Duc to cooperate with Duyet, Minh Mạng then appointed Duc to the post of Minister of the Board of War, putting him above the general in the chain of command, effectively making Duyet irrelevant with regards to the running of the protectorate. In 1831, just before Duyet's death, Minh Mạng began to dismantle his military infrastructure and sending his component units to other parts of Vietnam, and sent a loyalist General Nguyen Van Khue to Gia Định, allowing him to dilute the viceroy's power. In addition, no government reports could be officially approved and sent to the capital until it was countersigned by civil officials sent south by the emperor. These moves against southern autonomy gradually increased the resentment and regionalist sentiments among the local population.

== Family and personal life ==
Lê Văn Duyệt had a wife named Đỗ Thị Phận. Apart from Lê Văn Khôi, Duyệt had another adopted son named Lê Văn Yến who had married princess Ngoc Nghien, a daughter of Gia Long.

Duyệt was typically described as a stern, hot-tempered but fair man, which made him both feared and respected by people. Many lower-level bureaucrats and military officers were loath to speak to him directly, as were some higher officials. Some later accounts have portrayed his strict ways in a more negative light. According to the later imperial official Phan Thuc Truc, Duyệt sometimes fatally beat dogs and beheaded senior local officials for no reason. Duyệt was also regarded as an eccentric; he raised 30 members of the Montagnard hill tribes to act as servants, and kept exactly 100 chickens and 100 dogs at his home. Whenever he returned to his official residence after an assignment, he ordered a tiger and 50 dogs to march after him. In 1825, Michel-Duc Chaigneau, the nephew of Gia Long's French military mandarin Jean-Baptiste Chaigneau, visited Gia Định on a government mission and said that Duyệt "has great talent both in battle and administration. People fear him, but he is heartily loved by people here because he is fair."

He was also famous for his love of cockfighting, hát bội (Vietnamese classical opera) and court dancing, all of which were popular with the common Vietnamese southerner. He reportedly gave a long speech praising cockfighting, in a joking manner, to Emperor Gia Long and sometimes beat the drum himself in order to encourage the actors and actresses of the hát bội troupes when they were performing for him. He was also known for his patronage of goddess spirits that were popularly venerated by local southerners in folk religions. In addition, Duyệt was the instructor of three đình formalities, a code of ceremonial conduct and customs that were copies of royal rituals.

George Finlayson, a representative of the British government who visited Gia Định in 1822, described Duyệt as a man who liked to dress plainly, almost in a manner similar to his peasant constituents. Finlayson said that Duyệt "has an intelligent look, and may be esteemed to possess considerable activity both of mind and body: his face is round and soft, his features flabby and wrinkled; he has no beard, and bears considerable resemblance to an old woman: his voice, too, is shrill and feminine."

Duyệt's informal manner caused him difficulties during Minh Mạng's administration, as the second emperor's government was more oriented towards classical Confucianism than that of his father. The younger mandarins regarded Duyệt and his southern entourage as uncultured, and the older military officials felt more uncomfortable in the court as time went by. Gia Long was also seen a direct and frank man in his dealings, while Minh Mạng was seen as being vague in expressing his thoughts to his bureaucrats. This was attributed to Gia Long's dependence on military officers during the war years, which required him to be blunt and assertive, whereas Minh Mạng grew up dealing with court scholars after the establishment of the Nguyễn dynasty, and was regarded as a quiet and studious monarch. After a visit to the capital in 1824, Duyệt found the imperial court to be an uncomfortable surrounding and confided in a colleague:

The court recruits civil officials and wants to make a proper ruling system with them. Both of us have rise in the world from a military background. We only know straight expression and quick action, thus violating manners or official rules, sometimes. We are originally different from them. We had better give up our positions...to avoid possible mistakes.

Duyệt and fellow southern general Le Chat then resigned their positions, but the emperor rejected their offers. Duyệt wanted a post in the capital, but was not given one, in part of suspicions among the court that the general could launch a palace coup, not unlike many insurrections in Vietnam's past. Duyệt was sent back to southern Vietnam, far from the royal seat.

== Death and legacy ==
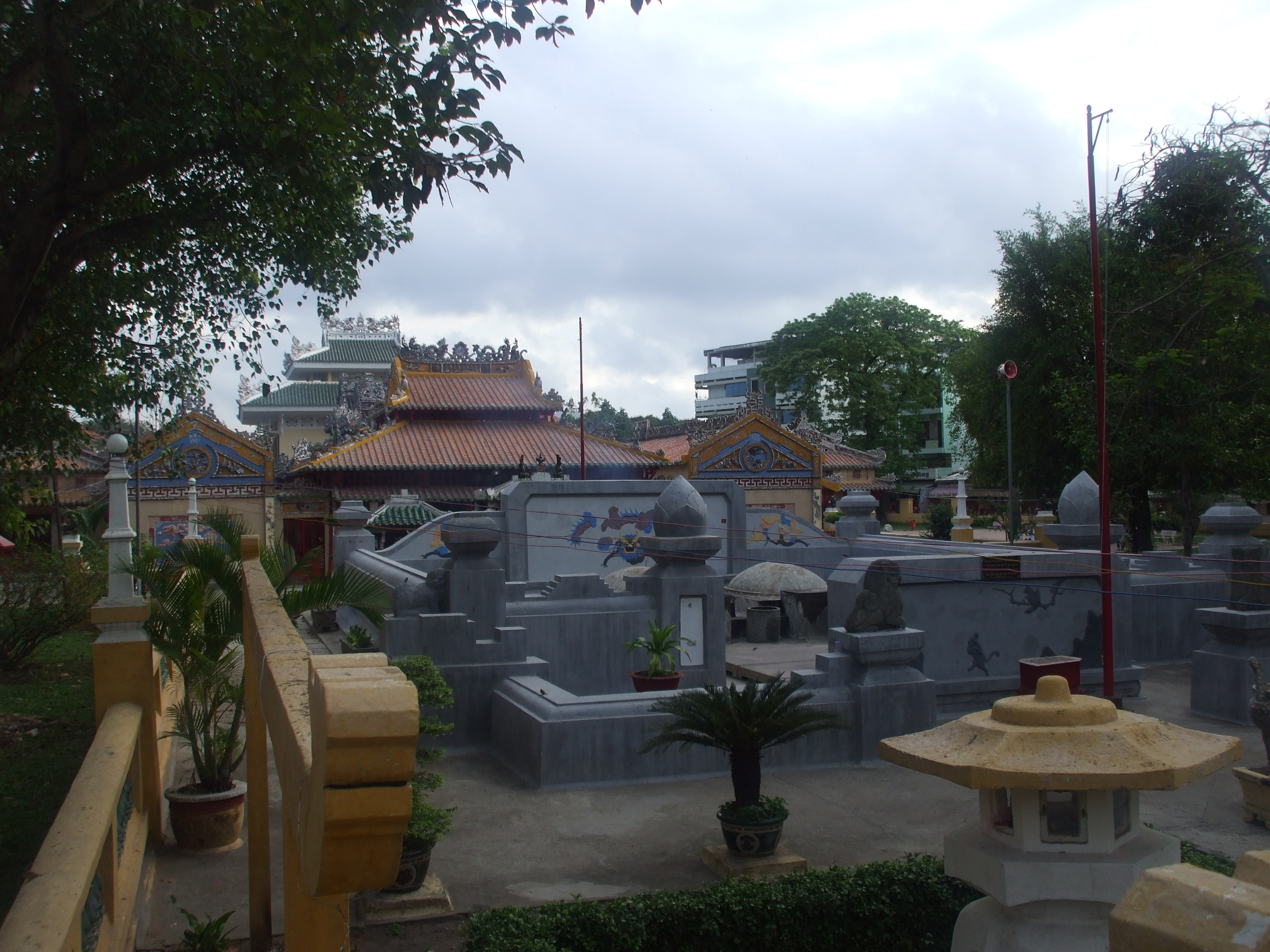
Grave of Lê Văn Duyệt and his wife.

On 30 July 1832, Duyệt died in the Citadel of Saigon at the age of 68. He was buried at Bình Hòa, Gia Định (present day Ho Chi Minh City). His tomb was called Lăng Ông Bà Chiểu ("Tomb of the Marshal in Ba Chieu") by the local people.

Duyệt's death opened the way for Minh Mạng to apply his policies in the south, as the viceroy's subordinates lacked the influence to defy the court. The emperor also tried to reduce Duyệt's followers’ political power by abolishing the post of viceroy and putting the south under his direct rule, thus making Duyệt the last holder of the post. Soon after Duyệt's death, Minh Mạng's new appointees arrived and took over the local administration. The new officials then launched an investigation and reported that Duyệt and his aides had engaged in corrupt and abusive practices.

As a result, Bach Xuan Nguyen, who led the investigation, ordered the posthumous humiliation of Duyệt. This resulted in the desecration of his tomb, the execution of sixteen relatives, and the arrests of his colleagues. Minh Mạng's attitude led Duyet's adopted son Khoi to break out of prison and start a revolt against the emperor on 10 May 1833.

After suppressing the revolt, which was supported by a Siamese invasion, lasted three years and briefly took control of the south, the emperor had Duyệt's tomb desecrated and had a stele with the inscription "Đây chỗ tên lại cái lộng quyền Lê Văn Duyệt chịu phép nước" ("Here lies the eunuch Lê Văn Duyệt who resisted the law") placed over the ruins. The tomb remained in disrepair until the reign of next emperor, Thiệu Trị, who rehabilitated Duyệt and restored his tomb. Then, Emperor Tự Đức turned the tomb into a national monument.

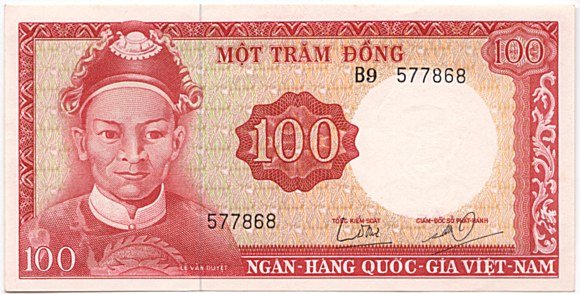
Lê Văn Duyệt, as depicted on a South Vietnamese 100-dong note

After the establishment of the colony of Cochinchina, Duyệt was continuously venerated despite French policies of dismantling the Vietnamese imperial system and its ritual customs. Duyệt's yearly celebrations were attended by politicians of Cochinchina. This was allowed to continue despite a legend in southern Vietnam that Duyệt had appeared in the dreams of Nguyen Trung Truc, a fisherman who famously led a peasant army against French colonization, and advised him on how to fight foreigners. In 1937, thanks to donations from a number of colonial government officials and members of the business elite, Duyệt's tomb was renovated and extended. Under South Vietnamese rule, Duyệt was considered a great national hero and his image appeared on banknotes, while prominent streets were named after him. In contrast, Duyệt was held in low regard by the current Vietnamese Communist Party government because of his role in the expansion of French influence in Vietnam, in line with the communist designation of the Nguyễn dynasty as "feudal" and "reactionary". After the fall of Saigon in 1975, Duyệt's tomb became dilapidated because of the lack of state maintenance and streets named in his honour were renamed. This attitude remained unchanged until 2008, when the current government had Duyệt's tomb renovated and allowed a play portraying his life to be performed publicly.

Nevertheless, Duyệt is widely regarded by southern Vietnamese people as the most important local hero. Choi described Duyệt's popularity as follows: "No matter whether they are indigenous Vietnamese or Chinese settlers, Buddhists or Christians, residents of Saigon have long paid enthusiastic tribute to one favorite southern, local hero—Lê Văn Duyệt—whose gorgeous shrine is located on Dinh Tien Hoang Street in Binh Thanh District. You will not able to find any other place in Huế or Hanoi where the residents, regardless of ethnic or religious backgrounds, regard their own local hero with such reverence".

== In popular culture ==
Lê Văn Duyệt, along with Nguyen Van Truong, Nguyen Van Nhon, Nguyen Huynh Duc and Truong Tan Buu (all of them were Nguyễn Ánh's generals) was called Ngũ hổ tướng ("Five Tiger Generals") in Vietnamese folk culture. Moreover, people usually regard Duyệt as Đức Tả Quân ("His Honorable Left Division's Marshal"), following the office of Tả Quân ("Marshal of Nguyễn dynasty Army's Left Division") which Duyệt was the holder for a time. Lê Văn Duyệt High School in Saigon was named after him.

To Europeans, he has been known as "Great Eunuch."

== See also ==
- Intersex in history
- Timeline of intersex history

== Notes ==
Footnote

Citations

Political offices
Preceded by Trương Tấn Bửu (acting)	Viceroy of Gia Định; 1812–1815	Succeeded by Nguyễn Huỳnh Đức
Preceded by Nguyễn Văn Nhơn	Viceroy of Gia Định; 1820–1832	Succeeded by none Viceroy's post abolished
