= Lê Văn Khôi =

Early 19th-century Vietnamese revolutionary

Lê Văn Khôi (chữ Hán: 黎文𠐤; died 1834) was the adopted son of the Vietnamese general Lê Văn Duyệt. He led the 1833–1835 Lê Văn Khôi revolt against Emperor Minh Mạng, but died in 1834.

As Duyệt was being prosecuted and his relatives condemned, Khôi had been imprisoned, but managed to escape on 10 May 1833. Soon, numerous people joined his revolt, in the desire to avenge Duyệt and challenge the legitimacy of the Nguyễn dynasty. Khôi fortified himself into the Citadel of Saigon and asked for the help of the Siamese.

Khôi died in December 1834 during the siege and was succeeded by his 8-year-old son Lê Văn Cù. The Citadel fell in September 1835, and Cù was tortured and executed, together with the French missionary Joseph Marchand.
