= Nguyễn Huỳnh Đức =

Vietnamese official (1748–1819)

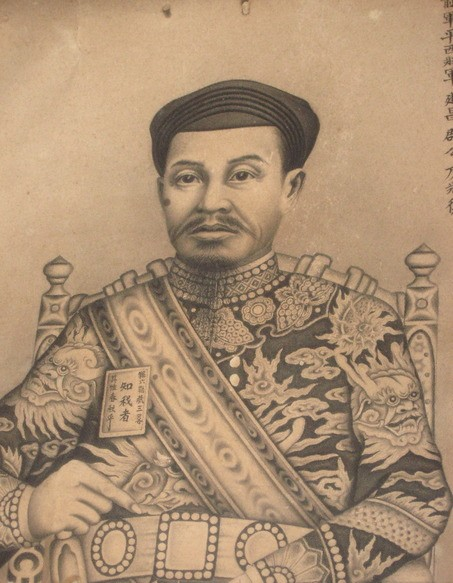
Portrait of Nguyễn Huỳnh Đức, was painted in 1802, when Nguyễn Ánh ascended to the throne

Nguyễn Huỳnh Đức (阮 黃 德; 1748–1819) was a general and official of the Nguyễn dynasty of Vietnam.

He served as a general of Nguyễn Ánh during the Nguyễn Lords' fight against the Tây Sơn rebellion. Nguyễn Ánh prevailed in 1802 and became Emperor Gia Long, establishing the Nguyễn dynasty. Duc then served as the viceroy of southern Vietnam during Gia Long's reign.

== Early years ==
He was born Huỳnh Tường Đức (黃祥德). He was awarded with the National family name Nguyễn for his deeds and valour. Since then, he has a double surname of Nguyễn Huỳnh. Nguyễn Huỳnh Đức was born and raised in Cái Én, Trường Khánh village, Định Viễn prefecture, Long Hồ camp (now Khánh Hậu ward, Tân An city, Long An province).

He came from a family of military officials. His paternal-grandfather Huỳnh Châu, and his father Huỳnh Lương both served under the Nguyễn Lords and were appointed Captains. In 1731, under the command of General Trương Phước Vĩnh, his grandfather and father participated in the suppression of Sá Tốt rebellion. The king of Chenla was frightened by the suppression of the rebellion, and as the result, he gifted lord Nguyễn Phúc Chu the lands of Peam Mesar (Mỹ Tho), and Longhôr (Vĩnh Long). To better control and defend the new lands, the Nguyễn lord allowed the establishment of prefecture Định Viễn, and Long Hồ camp. Civil and military officials were designated to the areas, followed by many Vietnamese to colonize the wild lands. Since then, Nguyễn Huỳnh Đức's family had stayed, worked the land, and established themselves there in his birthplace.

Political offices
Preceded by Lê Văn Duyệt	Viceroy of Gia Định; 1815–1819	Succeeded by Lê Văn Duyệt
