= Nguyễn Văn Nhơn =

Vietnamese general and official

Nguyễn Văn Nhơn (阮文仁, 1753–1822) was a general and official of the Nguyễn dynasty of Vietnam.

He served as a general of Nguyễn Ánh during the Nguyễn lords' fight against the Tây Sơn rebellion. Nguyễn Ánh prevailed in 1802 and became Emperor Gia Long, establishing the Nguyễn Dynasty. Nhơn then served as the viceroy of southern Vietnam during Gia Long's reign.
