= Olivier de Puymanel =

French naval officer (1768–1799)

Victor Olivier de Puymanel
- Born: 1768; Carpentras, Kingdom of France
- Died: 1799 (aged 30–31) Malacca, Malaysia
- Allegiance: France; Vietnam
- Branch: French Navy
- Conflicts: Nha Trang, 1795

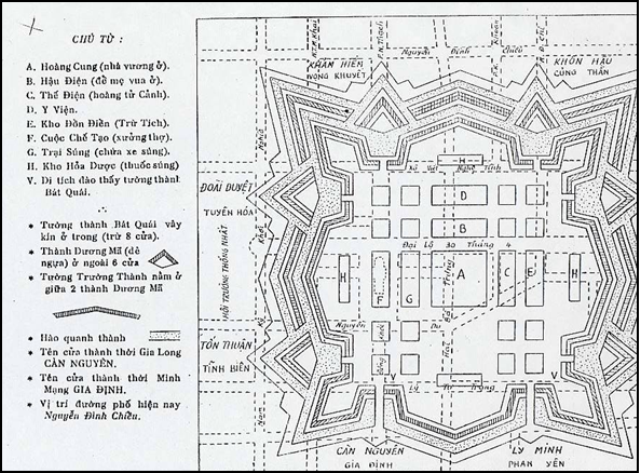
The Citadel of Saigon was built by Olivier de Puymanel according to the designs of Théodore Lebrun, following the principles of Vauban, in 1790.

Victor Olivier de Puymanel (1768 in Carpentras – 1799 in Malacca), Nguyễn Văn Tín (阮文信) or Ông Tín in Vietnamese, was a French construction officer and a French Navy volunteer and adventurer who had an important role in Vietnam in the 18th century. He played a key role in the modernization of the army of Nguyễn Phúc Ánh (the future Emperor Gia Long).

Olivier de Puymanel was second-class volunteer on board the French warship Dryade. In 1788 he deserted his ship while in Pulo Condor. He soon entered into the service of the Vietnamese prince Nguyễn Phúc Ánh at the instigation of Pigneau de Behaine, who was setting up a force of French volunteers to help the latter regain the throne.

Olivier de Puymanel supervised the construction of the Citadel of Saigon, according to the design of the French engineer in Vietnam Théodore Lebrun.

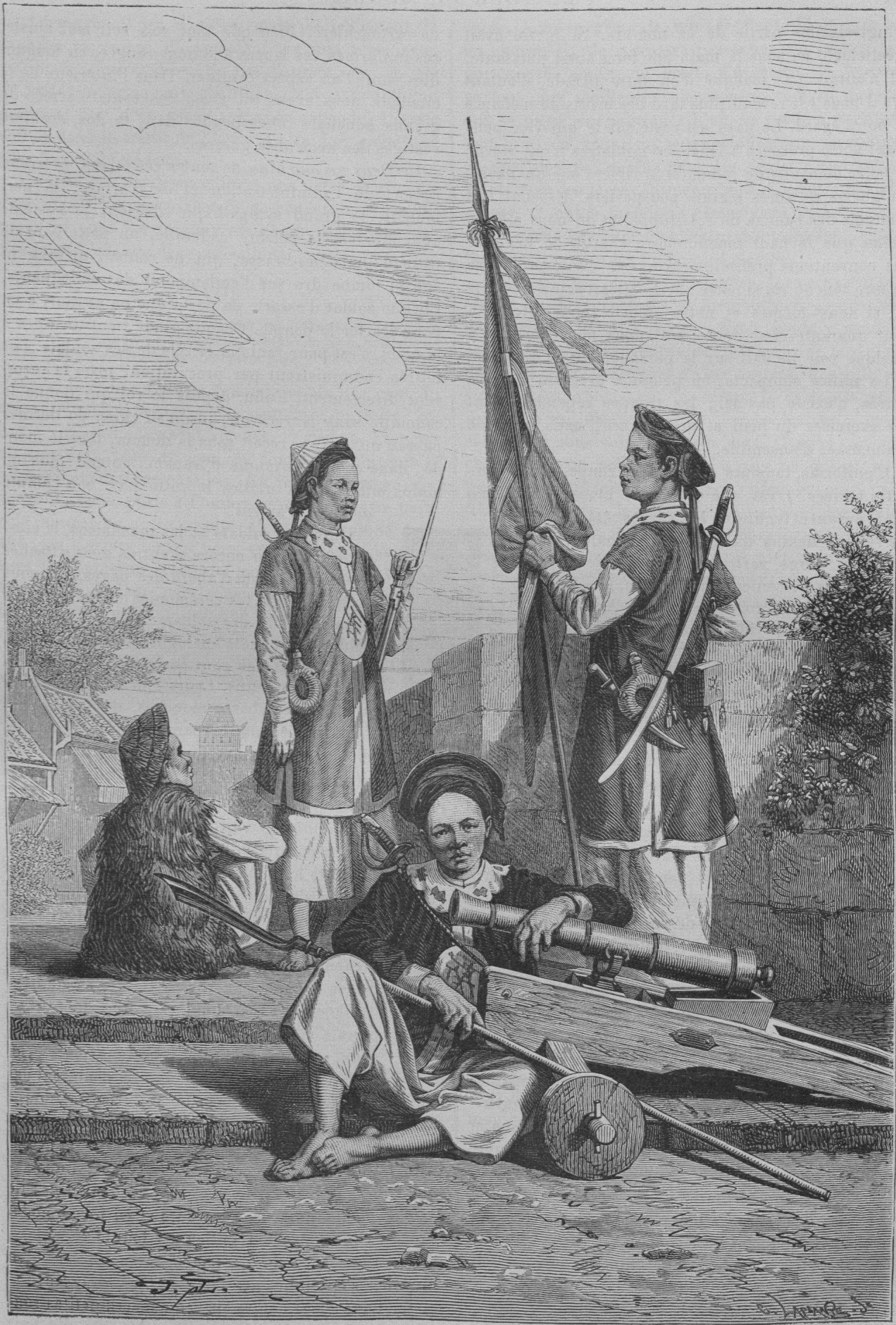
Vietnamese "Tirailleur" soldiers of the Nguyễn dynasty.

He also trained Vietnamese troops in the modern use of artillery, and implemented European infantry methods in the Vietnamese army of Nguyễn Phúc Ánh. In 1792, Olivier de Puymanel was commanding an army of 600 men who had been trained with European techniques.

Puymanel built a fortress in Duyên Khanh, near Nha Trang, where he defended the city against Tây Sơn forces, together with Pigneau de Behaine and Prince Cảnh. In 1795, Puymanel engineered the campaign to take Nha Trang.

Puymanel is said to have help organize train the men of Nguyen's army, while Dayot was in charge of the Navy. The results of these French efforts at the modernization of Vietnamese forces were attested by John Crawfurd, who visited Huế in 1822:

"In Cochin China a military organization has been established through the example and assistance of the French refugees in the country which has at least a very imposing appearance. The army consists of about forty thousand men uniformely clothed in British broad cloth, officered after the European manner and divided up into battalions under brigades. The park of artillery is numerous and excellent."

— Narrative of the Crawfurd mission....

Olivier de Puymanel also worked on the cartography of the Vietnamese coast, together with Jean-Marie Dayot, another French officer in the service of Nguyễn Phúc Ánh.

Pigneau de Behaine and Puymanel seem to have disliked each other, and Pigneau was rather unimpressed with Puymanel's drinking habits and reliance on Saigon prostitutes.

== See also ==
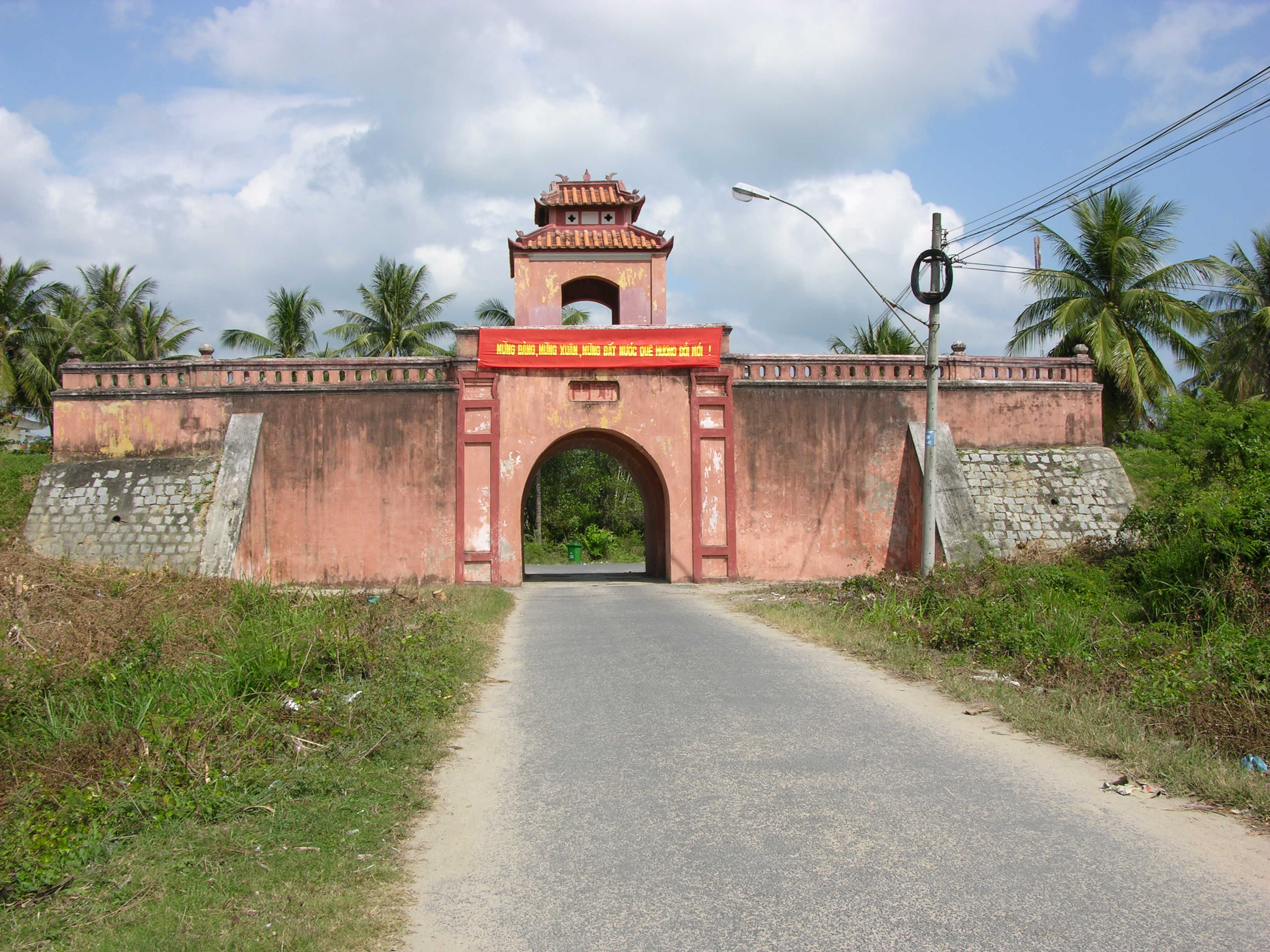
Front gate of the old citadel of Duyên Khanh, built by Olivier de Puymanel.

- France-Vietnam relations
