= Pierre Pigneau de Béhaine =

French missionary (1741–1799)

Pigneau de Béhaine
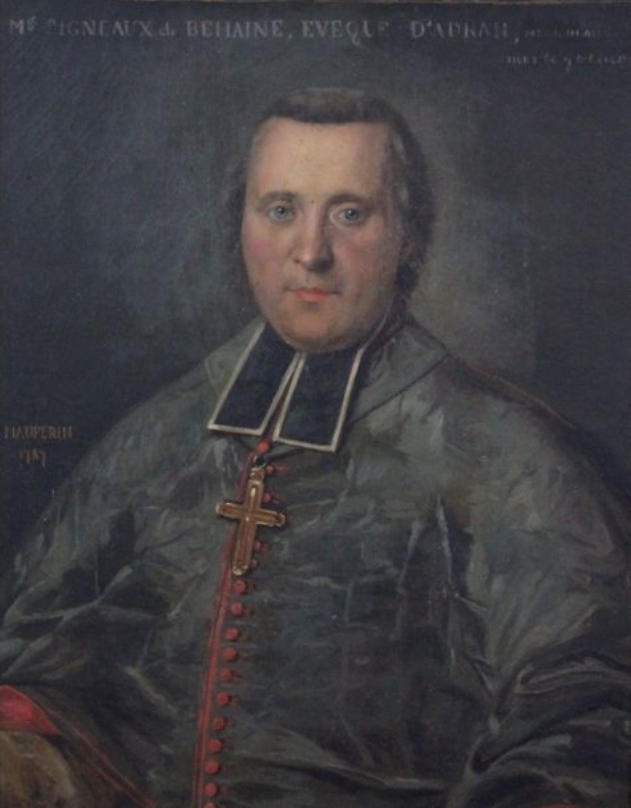
- 1850 portrait of de Béhaine by Eugénie Salanson
- Title: Apostolic Vicararite of Cochin

Personal life
- Born: 2 November 1741 Origny-en-Thiérache, France
- Died: 9 October 1799 (aged 57) Thị Nại, Vietnam

Religious life
- Religion: Roman Catholic
- Consecration: 24 February 1774 by Bernardo de São Caetano

Senior posting
- Based in: Vietnam
- Predecessor: Guillaume Piguel
- Successor: Jean Labartette

Pierre Joseph Georges Pigneau (2 November 1741 – 9 October 1799), commonly known as Pigneau de Béhaine (French: [piɲo d(ə) be.ɛn]), also Pierre Pigneaux, Bá Đa Lộc (Pedro" 百多祿), Bách Đa Lộc (伯多祿) and Bi Nhu ("Pigneau" 悲柔), was a French Roman Catholic bishop best known for his role in assisting Nguyễn Ánh (later Emperor Gia Long) to establish the Nguyễn dynasty in Vietnam after the Tây Sơn rebellion.

== Early life ==
Pierre Pigneau was born in Origny-en-Thiérache (later Aisne, France), where the family of his mother lived. His father's family owned a small estate named Béhaine, in the nearby parish of Marle. Despite the particule "de Béhaine" in his name, Pigneau was not of noble extraction, and it seems the particule first appeared only in the 1787 Treaty of Versailles.

Pigneau de Behaine was trained as a missionary and sent abroad by the Paris Foreign Missions Society (Séminaire des Missions Étrangères). He left France from the harbour of Lorient in December 1765, to work in southern Vietnam. He landed in Pondicherry, then a French possession in India, on 21 June 1766.

Pigneau had arrived just prior to the Burmese capture of Ayutthaya in Siam. After waiting for a few months in the Portuguese colony of Macau, Pigneau travelled on a Chinese ship to reach the small coastal town Hà Tiên in Cochinchina (Southern Vietnam) near the Cambodian border, set up by missionaries who had been displaced by the Burmese. He arrived there in March 1767.

== Superior of the College General (1767–1774) ==
In Ha Tien, Pigneau worked as head of the Seminary of the Holy Angels, the seminary established in Asia by the Paris Foreign Missions Society, which had relocated from Ayutthaya in Siam following the 1765 Burmese invasion, with approximately forty students of Chinese, Siamese, and Vietnamese extraction.

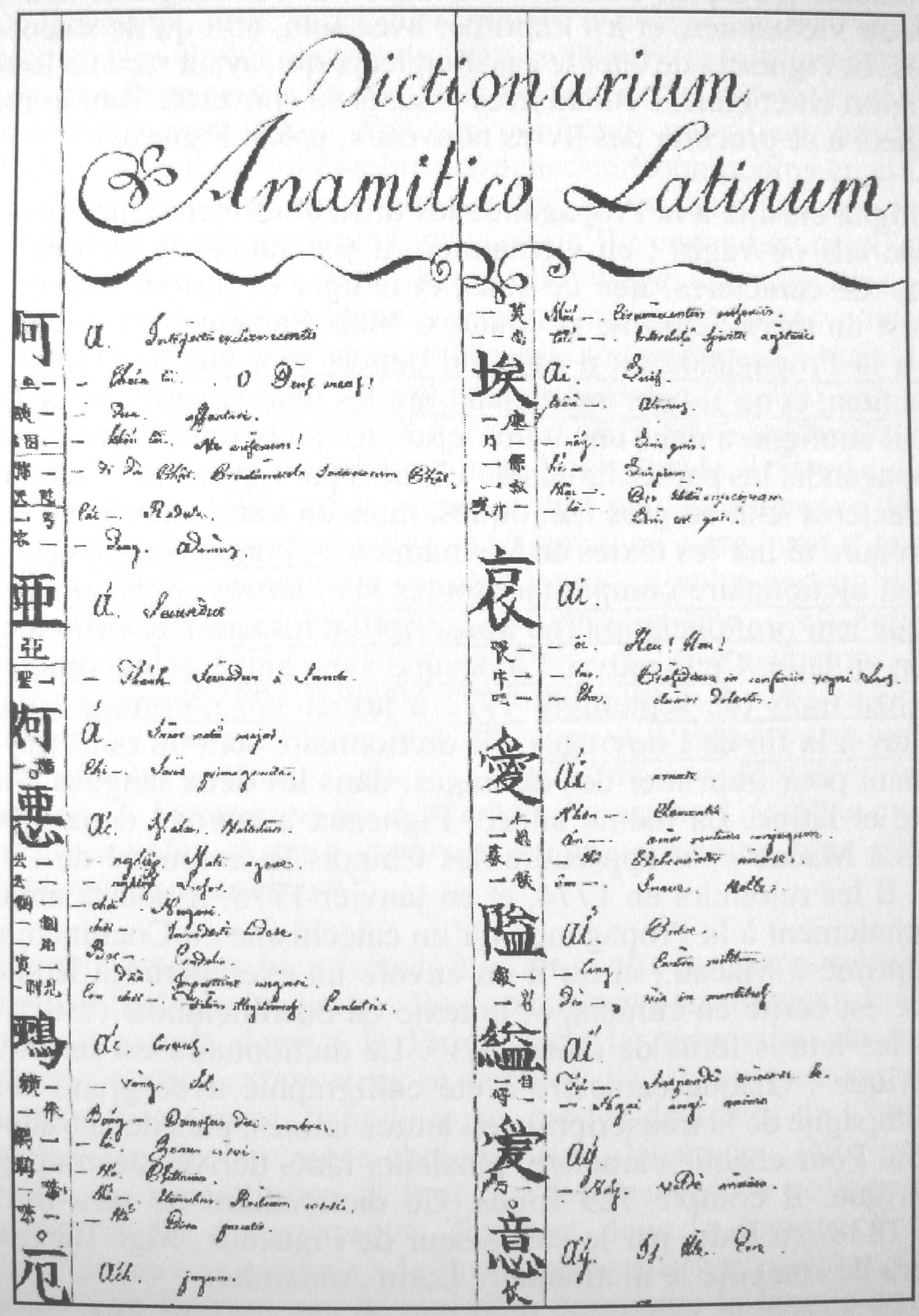
A page of the 1773 Annamite–Latin manuscript dictionary created by Pigneau de Behaine.

In 1768, the missionaries were jailed for three months when Siamese authorities complained to the local ruler Mạc Thiên Tứ that the school had afforded shelter to a fugitive Siamese prince. Pigneau was put into a cangue, a wooden and iron frame fastened around his limbs weighing eight pounds. He ignored family requests to return to France, saying that his missionary work was more important than a comfortable life. In 1769, the school was attacked by Chinese and Cambodian pirates, who massacred some of the students and burnt down the establishment... Pigneau was forced to flee in December 1769 with the survivors to Pondicherry, then a French territory, after a long sea journey through Malacca. The College was established a few miles from Pondicherry, in Virampatnam.

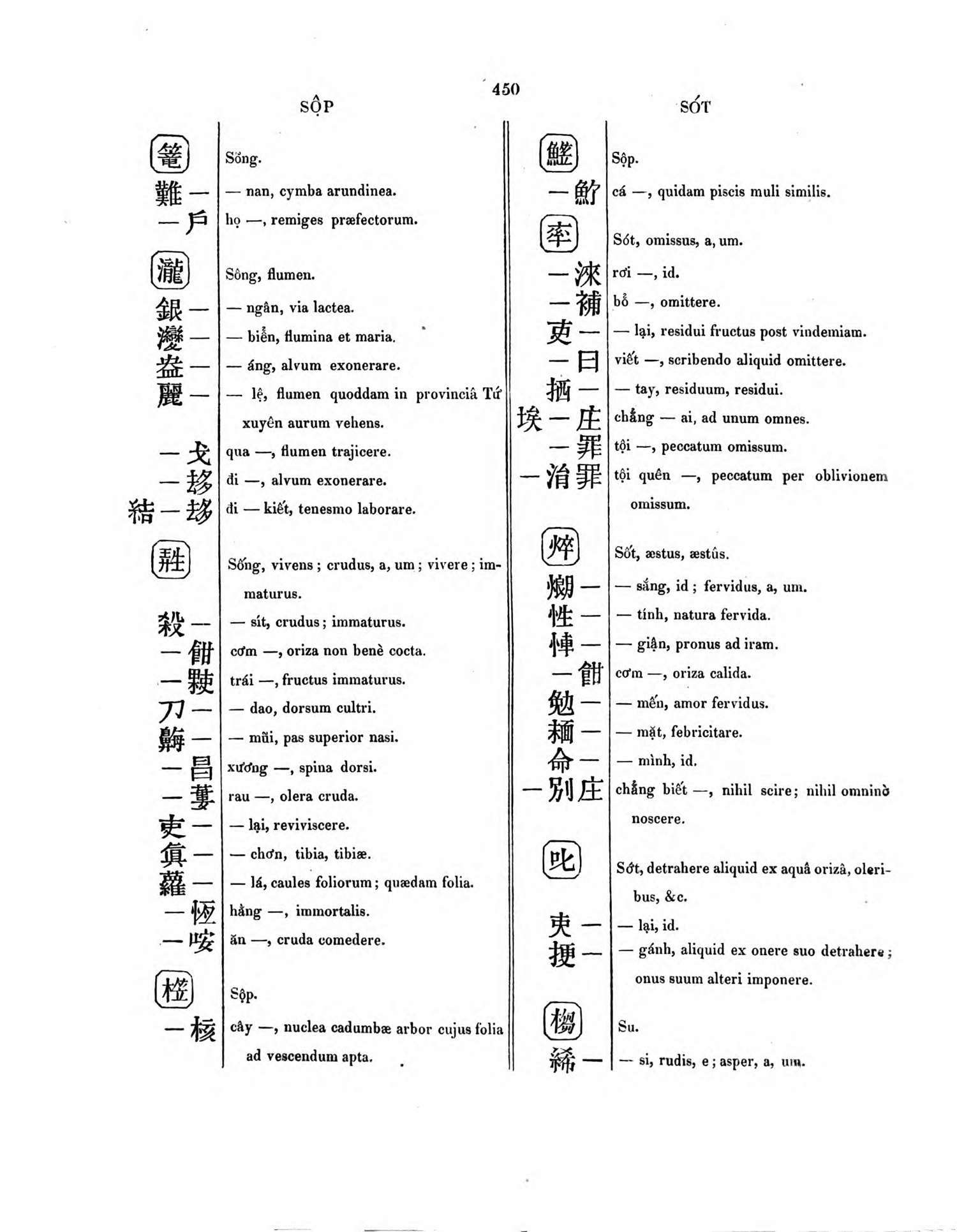
Pigneau de Behaine's dictionary was published in 1838 by Mgr Jean-Louis Taberd.

While in Pondicherry, Pigneau continued mastering Chinese and Vietnamese languages until he was fully conversant with both. In 1773, he compiled a Vietnamese-Latin dictionary with the help of eight southern Vietnamese, following in the footsteps of Alexandre de Rhodes. His work, Dictionarium Anamitico-Latinum, would be published in 1838 by Mgr Jean-Louis Taberd.

Pigneau de Behaine was appointed bishop in partibus infidelium of Adran in Syria, and Apostolic Vicar of Cochinchina on 24 September 1771. After his ordination on 24 February 1774 in São Tomé near Madras, he went to Macau to gather more staff before returning to resume his work in Ha Tien. In Macau, he was able to publish and print a catechism in Vietnamese (containing an introduction in Chinese, the body of the text in the Vietnamese alphabet, and a translation in Latin), and despatched a copy to Rome. He left Macau on 1 March 1775, and reached Ha Tien later in the month, where he again re-established missionary operations.

In 1775-76, Pigneau attempted to convert the Stieng people, but the missionaries he sent suffered greatly, and either fell ill or returned.

== Encounter with Nguyễn Ánh ==
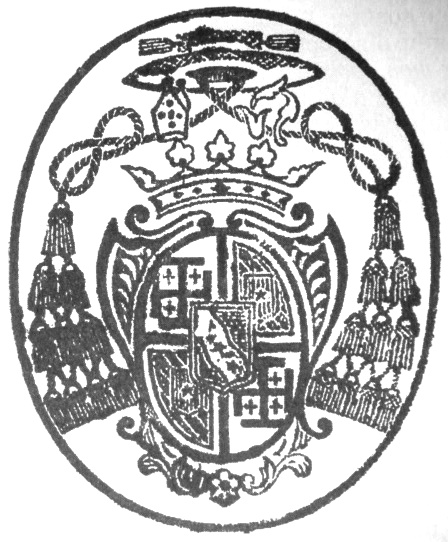
Episcopal seal of Mgr Pigneau de Behaine.

In 1777, the Tây Sơn brothers attacked Saigon and eliminated almost the entire Nguyễn dynasty, with the fifteen-year-old Nguyễn Ánh managing to escape into the far south. He took refuge at Pigneau's seminary from September to October before both were forced to flee to the island of Pulo Panjang in the Gulf of Siam. The move was a political step taken by Pigneau to align himself with Nguyễn Ánh, allowing himself a foray into politics. He became less of a missionary and more of a politician thereafter.

In November 1777, Nguyễn Ánh was able to recapture Saigon, and in 1778 pursued the retreating Tây Sơn as far as Bình Thuận.

In neighbouring Cambodia, a pro-Cochinchinese revolt erupted to topple the pro-Siam king Ang Non. In 1780, Cochinchinese troops intervened, and Pigneau helped them procure weapons from the Portuguese. The Bishop attracted accusations by the Portuguese of manufacturing weapons for the Cochinchinese, especially grenades, a new weapon for Southeast Asia. Pigneau de Behaine also organized the supply of three Portuguese warships for Nguyễn Ánh. In his activities, Pigneau was supported by a French adventurer, Manuel.

In 1782, the Tây Sơn led a new offensive to the South. Manuel died in his command of a warship in the Saigon river against Tây Sơn troops. The defeat, with its battle plan deemed faulty, towers high in the list of setbacks suffered. Nguyễn Ánh was forced to retreat to the island of Phú Quốc. In October 1782, the tide turned again and Nguyễn Ánh and Pigneau returned to Saigon.

In March 1783, the Nguyễn were again defeated, and Nguyễn Ánh and Pigneau once more set sail for Phú Quốc. Sanctuary was at once both fleeting and illusory. They had to escape again when their hideout was discovered, being chased from island to island until they reached Siam. Pigneau de Behaine visited the Siamese court in Bangkok in late 1783. Nguyễn Ánh also arrived there in February 1784, where he enlisted an army to accompany him back to Vietnam. In January 1785 however the Siamese fleet met with disaster against the Tây Sơn in the Mekong river.

Nguyễn Ánh again took refuge with the Siamese court, and again tried to seek help from the Siamese. Resolving to muster any support he could from Western powers., Nguyễn Ánh asked Pigneau to appeal for French aid, and pledged to allow Pigneau to take his son Prince Cảnh with him. Pigneau in return attempted to obtain assistance from Manila, but the party of Dominicans he sent was captured by the Tây Sơn. From Pondicherry, he also sent a request for help to the Portuguese Senate in Macao, which would ultimately lead to the signature of a Treaty of Alliance between Nguyễn Ánh and the Portuguese on 18 December 1786 in Bangkok.

== Embassy to France ==
The party reached Pondicherry in February 1785. The French administration in Pondicherry, led by the interim Governor Coutenceau des Algrains, successor of Bussy, seconded by Captain d'Entrecasteaux, was resolutely opposed to intervening in southern Vietnam, stating that it was not in the national interest. In July 1786, Pigneau was allowed to travel back to France to ask the royal court directly for assistance. News of his activities reached Rome where he was denounced by the Spanish Franciscans. Pigneau at that point offered Prince Cảnh and his political mandate to the Portuguese. They left Pondicherry for France in July 1786. which they reached in February 1787.

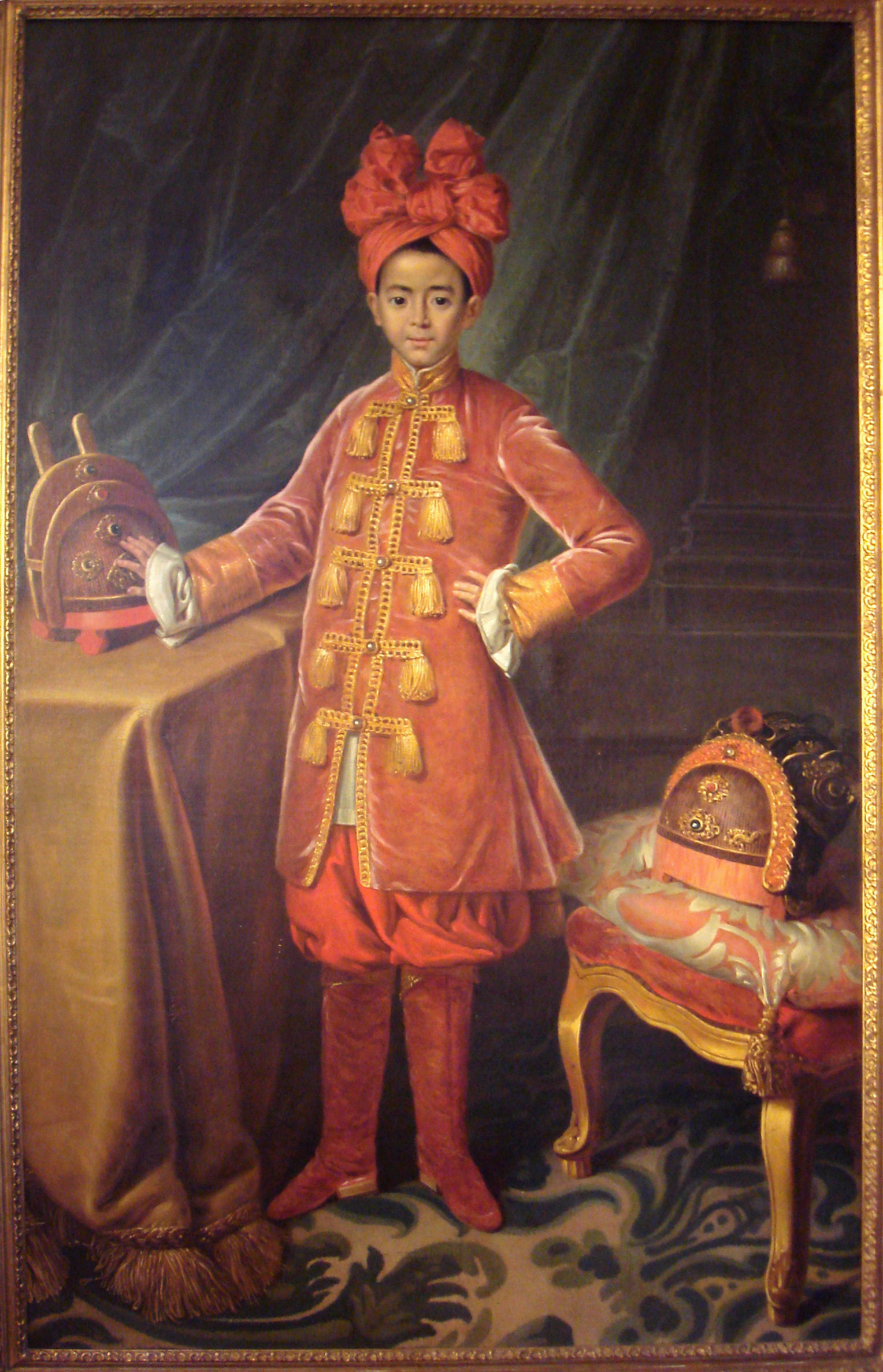
Portrait of crown prince Nguyễn Phúc Cảnh in France, 1787.

Arriving in February 1787 with the child prince Canh at the court of Louis XVI in Versailles, Pigneau had difficulty in gathering support for a French expedition to install Nguyễn Ánh on the throne. This was due to the poor financial state of the country prior to the French Revolution. Pigneau was helped by Pierre Poivre who had been involved previously in French interests in Vietnam.

Eventually, he was able to seduce military figures with precise instructions as to the conditions of warfare in Indochina and materiel for the proposed campaign. He explained how France would be able to "dominate the seas of China and of the archipelago." The party met with King Louis XVI, Minister of the Navy de Castries and Minister of Foreign Affairs Montmorin on 5 or 6 May 1787. Prince Cảnh created a sensation at the court of Louis XVI, leading the famous hairdresser Léonard to create a hairstyle in his honour "au prince de Cochinchine". His portrait was made in France by Maupérin, and is now on display at the Séminaire des Missions Étrangères in Paris. Prince Cảnh dazzled the Court and even played with the son of Louis XVI, Louis-Joseph, Dauphin of France, who was about the same age.

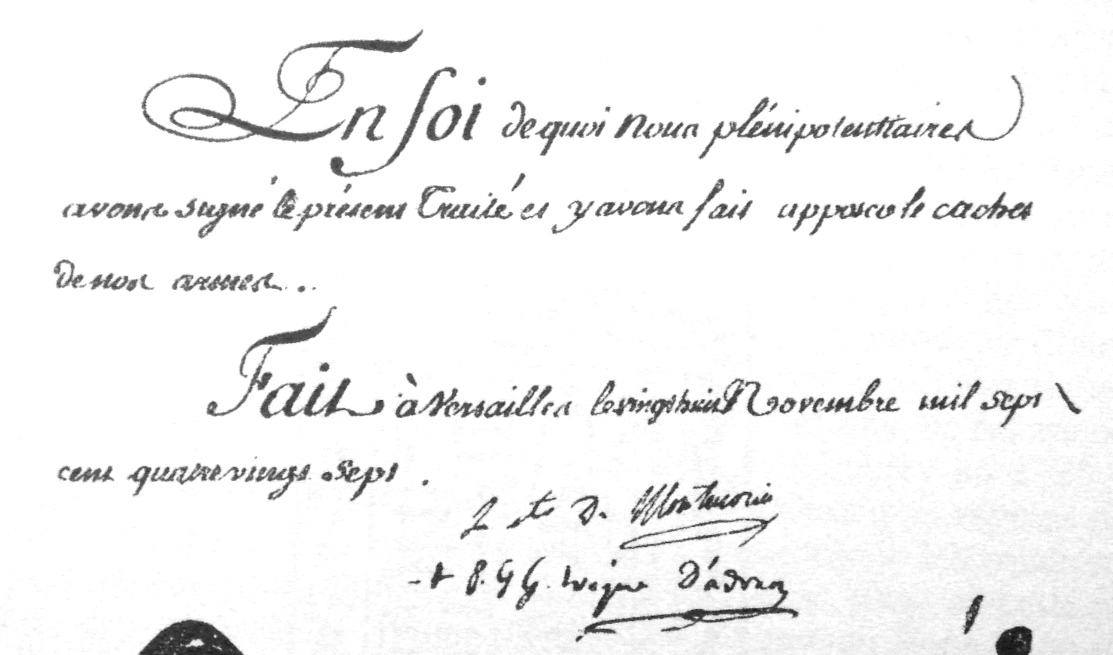
Signatures of the 1787 Treaty of Versailles: Montmorin, Minister of Foreign Affairs and the Navy, and Evèque d'Adran, i.e. Pigneau de Béhaine.

By November, his constant pressure had proved effective. On 21 November 1787, the Treaty of Versailles was concluded between France and Cochinchina in Nguyễn Ánh's name. Four frigates, 1650 fully equipped French soldiers and 250 Indian sepoys were promised in return for Pulo Condore and harbour access at Tourane (Da Nang). De Fresne was supposed to be the leader of the expedition.

The French government, on the eve of the French Revolution, was in dreadful financial trouble, and saw its position weakened even more with the outbreak of civil war in Holland. French enthusiasm for Pigneau's plan was severely dampened. A few days after the treaty was signed, the foreign minister sent instructions on 2 December 1787 to the Governor of Pondicherry Thomas Conway, which left the execution of the treaty to his own appreciation of the situation in Asia, stating that he was "free not to accomplish the expedition, or to delay it, according to his own opinion" Louis XVI himself told Pigneau that Conway was appointed Governor of Pondicherry simply to remove him from Europe.

== Return to Vietnam ==
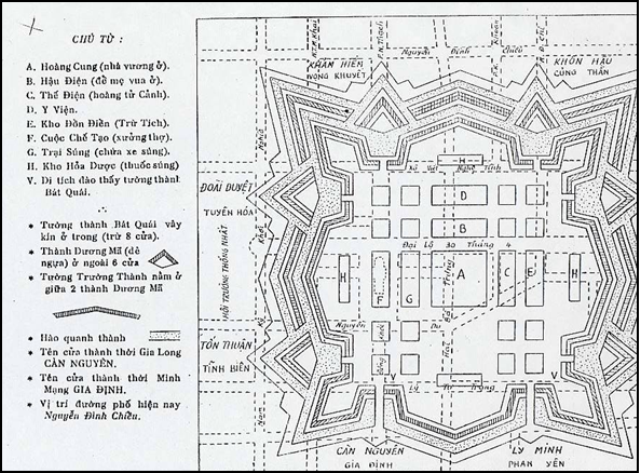
The Citadel of Saigon was built by Olivier de Puymanel according to the designs of Théodore Lebrun, following the principles of Vauban, in 1790.

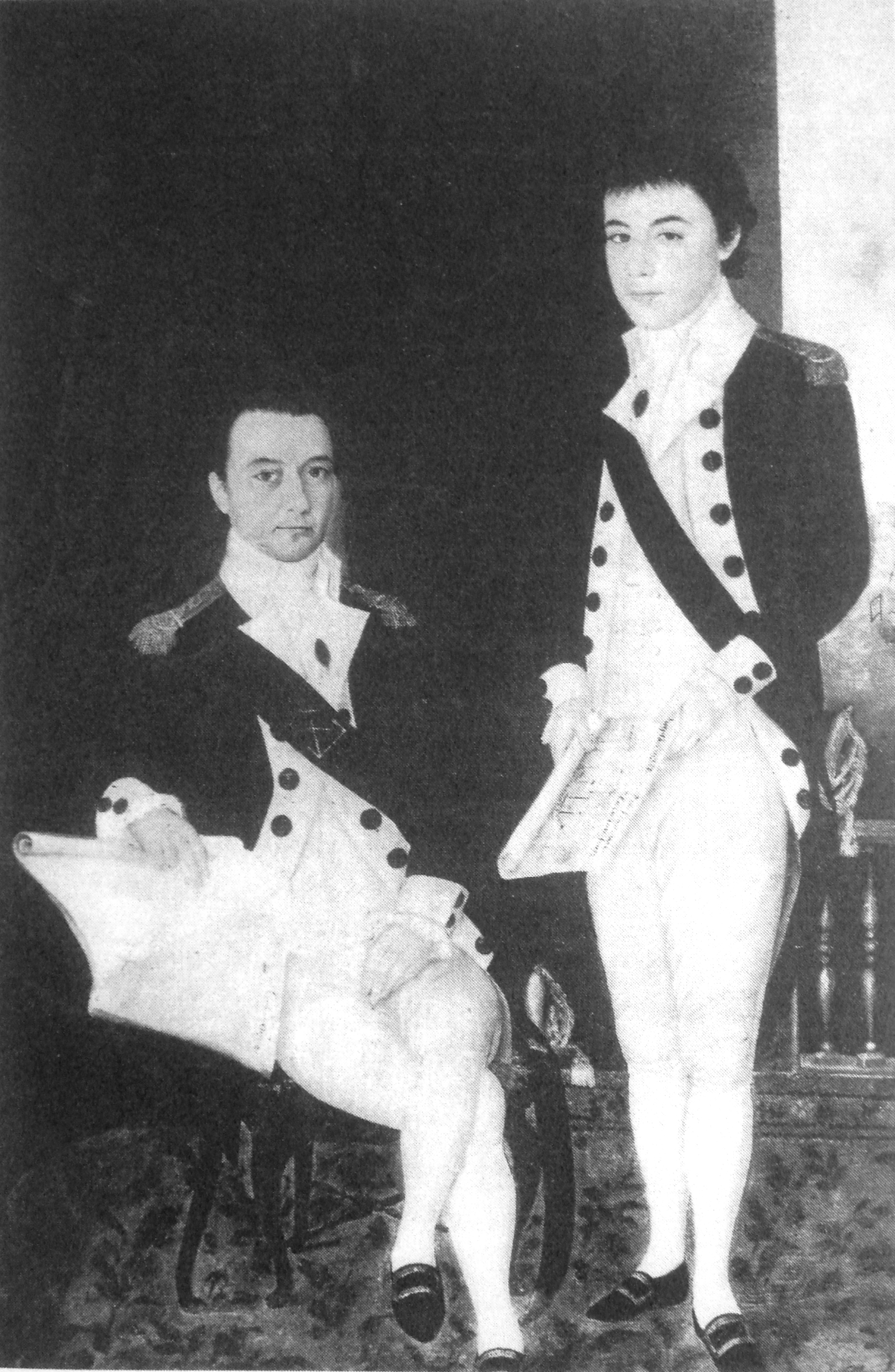
Jean-Marie Dayot (left) took a leading role in the Navy of Nguyễn Ánh.

The party left France in December 1787 on board the Dryade, commanded by M. de Kersaint and accompanied by the Pandour, commanded by M. de Préville. They would again disembark in Pondicherry from May 1788 to July 1789. The Dryade was ordered by Conway to continue to Poulo Condor to meet with Nguyễn Ánh and deliver him 1,000 muskets bought in France and Father Paul Nghi, a Cochinchinese missionary devotee of Mgr Pigneau.

However, Pigneau found the governor of Pondicherry unwilling to further fulfill the agreement. Although the Royal Council had already decided in October 1788 to endorse Conway, Pigneau was not informed until April. Pigneau was forced to use funds raised in France and enlist French volunteers. Of this duplicity, he defiantly noted: "I shall make the revolution in Cochinchina alone." He rejected an offer from the British East India Company, and raised money from French merchants in the region. Conway finally provided two ships to Pigneau, the Méduse, commanded by François Étienne de Rosily-Mesros, and another frigate. Pigneau used the raised funds to equip two more ships with weapons and ammunition, which he named the Long ("Dragon"), commanded by Jean-Baptiste Chaigneau, and the Phụng ("Phoenix"), commanded by Philippe Vannier, and enticed volunteers and deserters to man the vessels. Jean-Marie Dayot deserted the Pandour and was put in charge of supplies, transporting weapons and ammunitions on his ship the St. Esprit. Rosily, who had been commanding the Méduse deserted with 120 of his men, and was put in charge of recruitments.

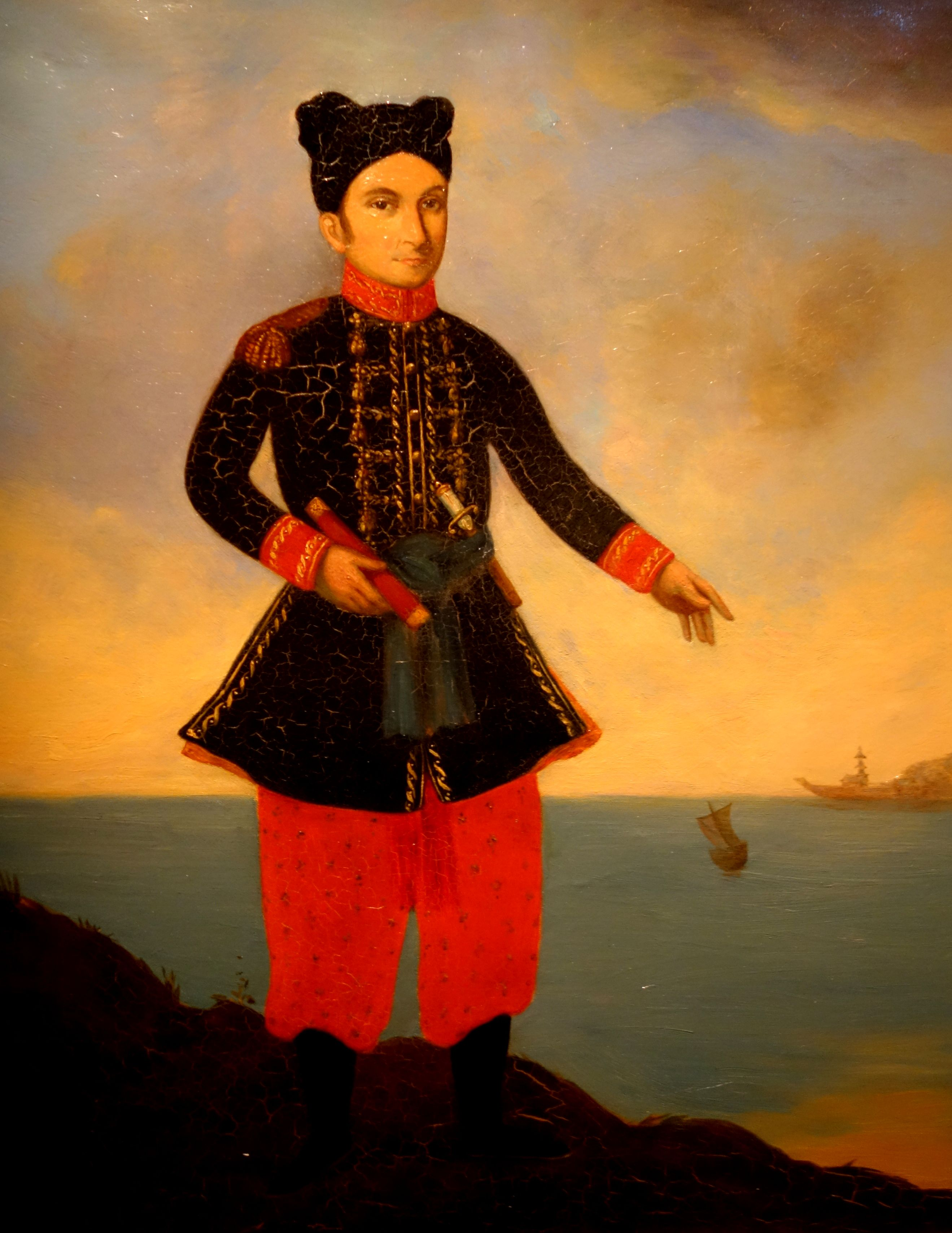
Jean-Baptiste Chaigneau in mixed Franco-Vietnamese uniform.

Pigneau's expedition left for Vietnam on 19 June 1789 and arrived at Vũng Tàu on 24 July 1789. The foreign contingent helped to consolidate southern Vietnam and modernized its army, navy and fortifications. Olivier de Puymanel, a former officer of the Dryade who has deserted in Poulo Condor, built in 1790 the Citadel of Saigon and in 1793 the Citadel of Diên Khánh according to the principles of Vauban. He also instructed Vietnamese troops in the modern use of artillery, and implemented European infantry methods in the Vietnamese army of Nguyễn Phúc Ánh. In 1792, Olivier de Puymanel was commanding an army of 600 men who had been trained with European techniques. Puymanel is said to have trained the 50,000 men of Nguyen's army. French bombs were used at the siege of Qui Nhơn in 1793.

French Navy officers such as Jean-Marie Dayot and Jean-Baptiste Chaigneau were used to drill the navy. By 1792, a large naval fleet was formed, with two European warships and 15 frigates of composite design. In 1792, Dayot attacked the strategically important port of Qui Nhơn, opening the way to the Cochinchinese ships which then defeated the Tây Sơn fleet. In 1793, Dayot led a raid in which 60 Tây Sơn galleys were destroyed.

From 1794, Pigneau took part in all campaigns, accompanying Prince Cảnh. He organized the defense of Diên Khánh when it was besieged by a numerically vastly superior Tây Sơn army in 1794.

== Death ==
Tomb of Pigneau de Behaine.

Heavy fighting raged in Qui Nhơn for control of the fortress until it was captured in 1799. Pigneau died there of dysentery on 9 October in the same year, after serving his final years as an advisor and de facto foreign minister to Nguyễn Ánh. He was buried at Saigon with full military honours. Nguyễn Ánh's funeral oration described him as "the most illustrious foreigner ever to appear at the court of Cochinchina." He was buried on 16 December 1799 in the presence of the crown prince, all mandarins of the court, the royal bodyguard of 12,000 men and 40,000 mourners.

Pigneau de Behaine was the object of several funeral orations on behalf of emperor Gia Long and his son Prince Cảnh. In a funeral oration dated 8 December 1799, Gia Long praised Pigneau de Behaine's involvement in the defense of the country, as well as their personal friendship:

Funeral oration of emperor Gia Long to Pigneau de Behaine (excerpt):

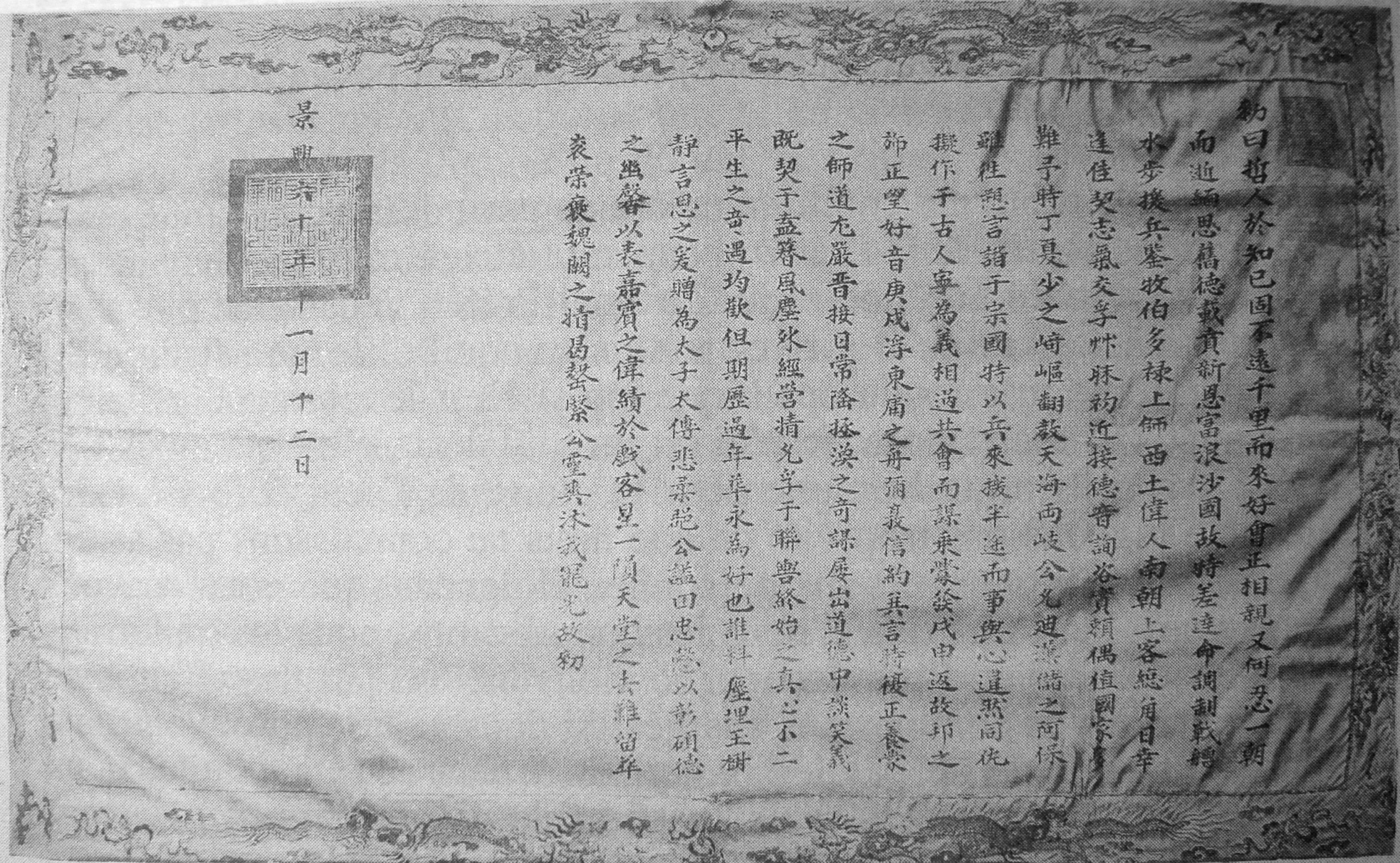
Funeral oration of emperor Gia Long to Pigneau de Behaine, 8 December 1799.

"(...) Pondering without end the memory of his virtues, I wish to honour him again with my kindness, his Highness Bishop Pierre, former special envoy of the kingdom of France mandated to obtain a sea-based and land-based military assistance sent by decree by warships, him, this eminent personality of the Occident received as a guest of honour at Southern Court (...) Although he went to his own country to address a plea for help and rally the opinion in order to obtain military assistance, he was met with adverse conditions midway through his endeavour. At that time, sharing my resentment, he decided to act like the men of old: we rather rallied together and outshone each other in the accomplishment of duty, looking for ways to take advantage of opportunities to launch operations (...) Everyday intervening constantly, many times he marvelously saved the situation with extraordinary plans. Although he was preoccupied with virtue, he did not lack humour. Our agreement was such that we always desired to be together (...) From the beginning to the end, we were but one heart (...)"

— Funeral oration of emperor Gia Long to Pigneau de Behaine, 8 December 1799.

Pigneau de Behaine was granted the position Thái tử Thái phó (太子太傅, "Crown Prince's Tutor") and the noble title Bi Nhu Quận công (悲柔郡公, lit. "provincial duke Bi Nhu") posthumously. He also received the posthumous name Trung Ý (忠懿 lit. "loyalty and kindness") from Gia Long.

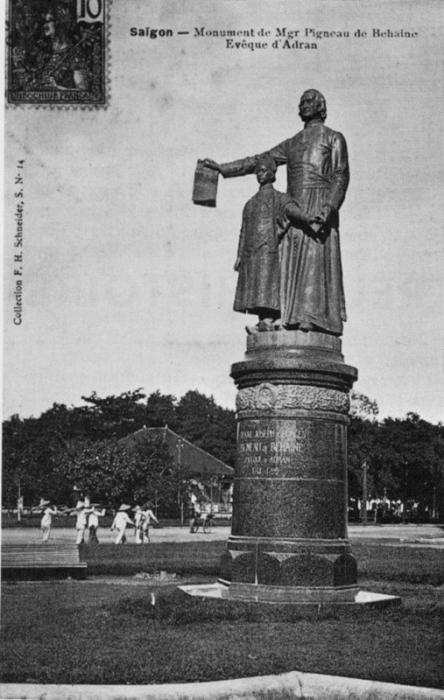
Statue of Pigneau de Behaine, with Prince Cảnh and holding the Treaty of Versailles, in Saigon.

Only a few of Pigneau's men stayed for more than two or three year, disappointed in the lack of a quick fortune. Pigneau himself had wanted a Catholic as ruler of Vietnam. His ambition never materialised with the failure to convert Canh, who predeceased his father Nguyễn Ánh by twenty years in any case.

Pigneau often compromised his religious principles when they came into conflict with political and diplomatic imperatives. He had initially taught Canh to refuse to engage in ancestor worship, something that greatly shocked and angered Nguyễn Ánh. He later changed his mind on the papal ban and proposed to consider ancestor worship as a civil ceremony, a simple manifestation of respect for the dead. He cited the apostles as being tolerant of local customs as his justification.

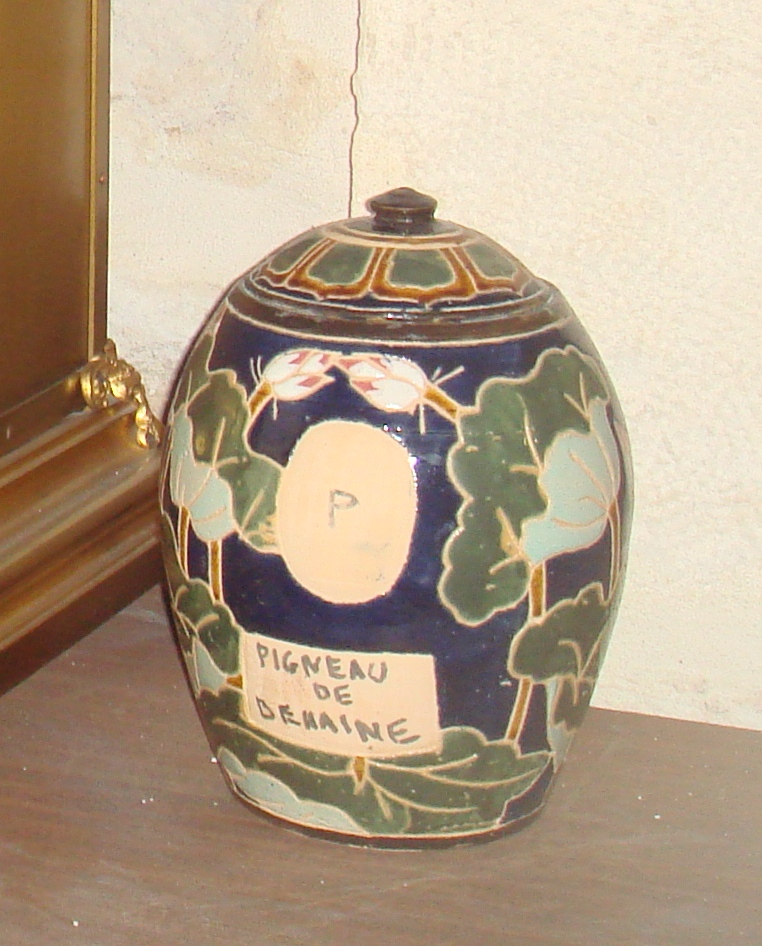
Ashes of Pigneau de Behaine, at the Paris Foreign Missions Society.

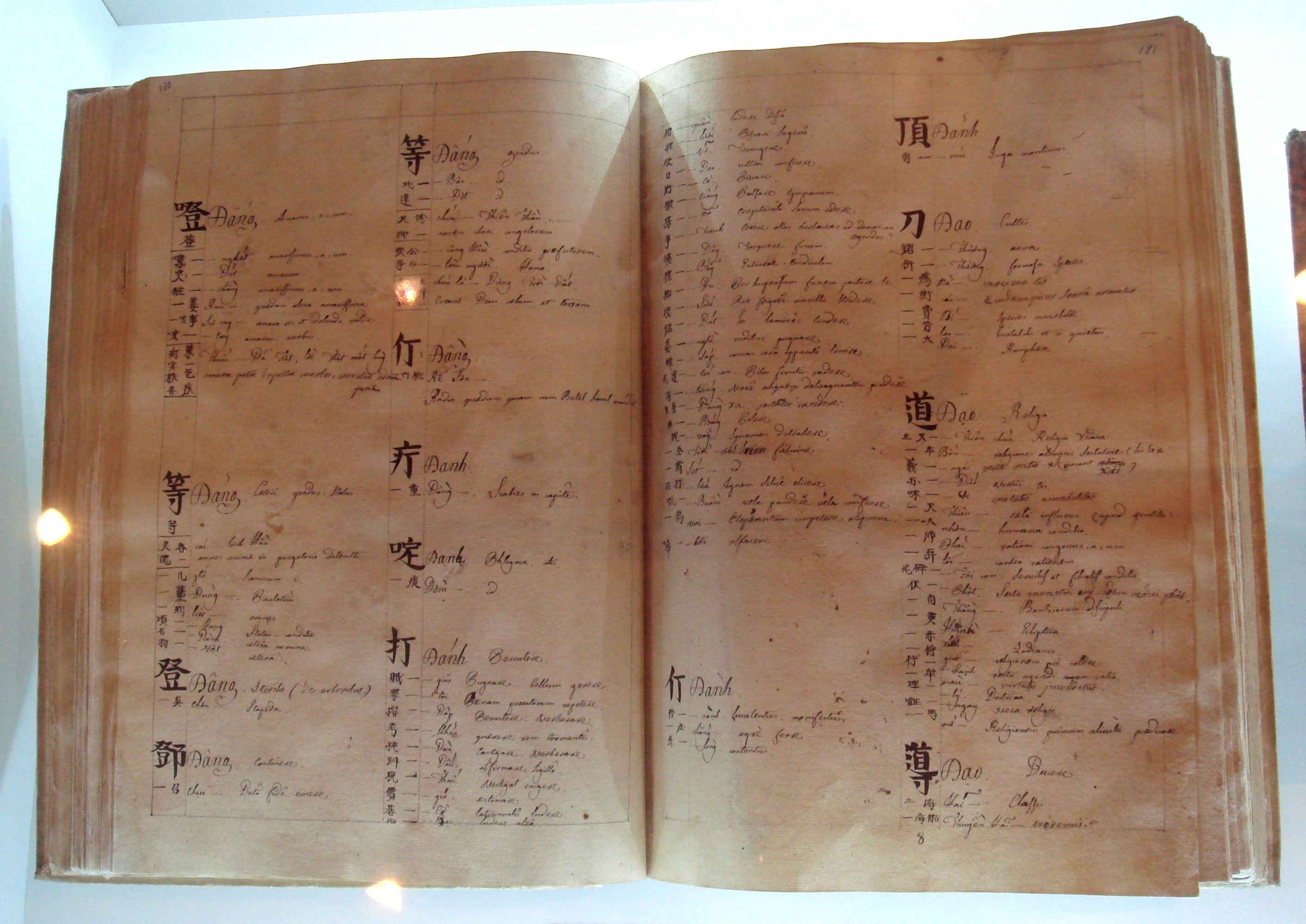
Pigneau's 1772 Dictionarium Anamitico-Latinum, at the Paris Foreign Missions Society.

In 1901, the French unveiled a statue of Pigneau de Béhaine and Prince Canh in front of the Saigon cathedral. A manifestation of French colonial rule, the statue highlighted the long historical connection between France and the Vietnamese people.

In 1983, the tomb of Pigneau de Behaine was dismantled by the Vietnamese government, and the area was replaced by a park. His remains were cremated and sent to France where they are now housed in the Paris Foreign Missions Society.

== Works ==
- Dictionarium Anamitico-Latinum, 1772.

== See also ==
- France–Vietnam relations
