= Nguyễn Phúc Cảnh =

Nguyễn Phúc Cảnh 阮福景
- Crown Prince of Vietnam
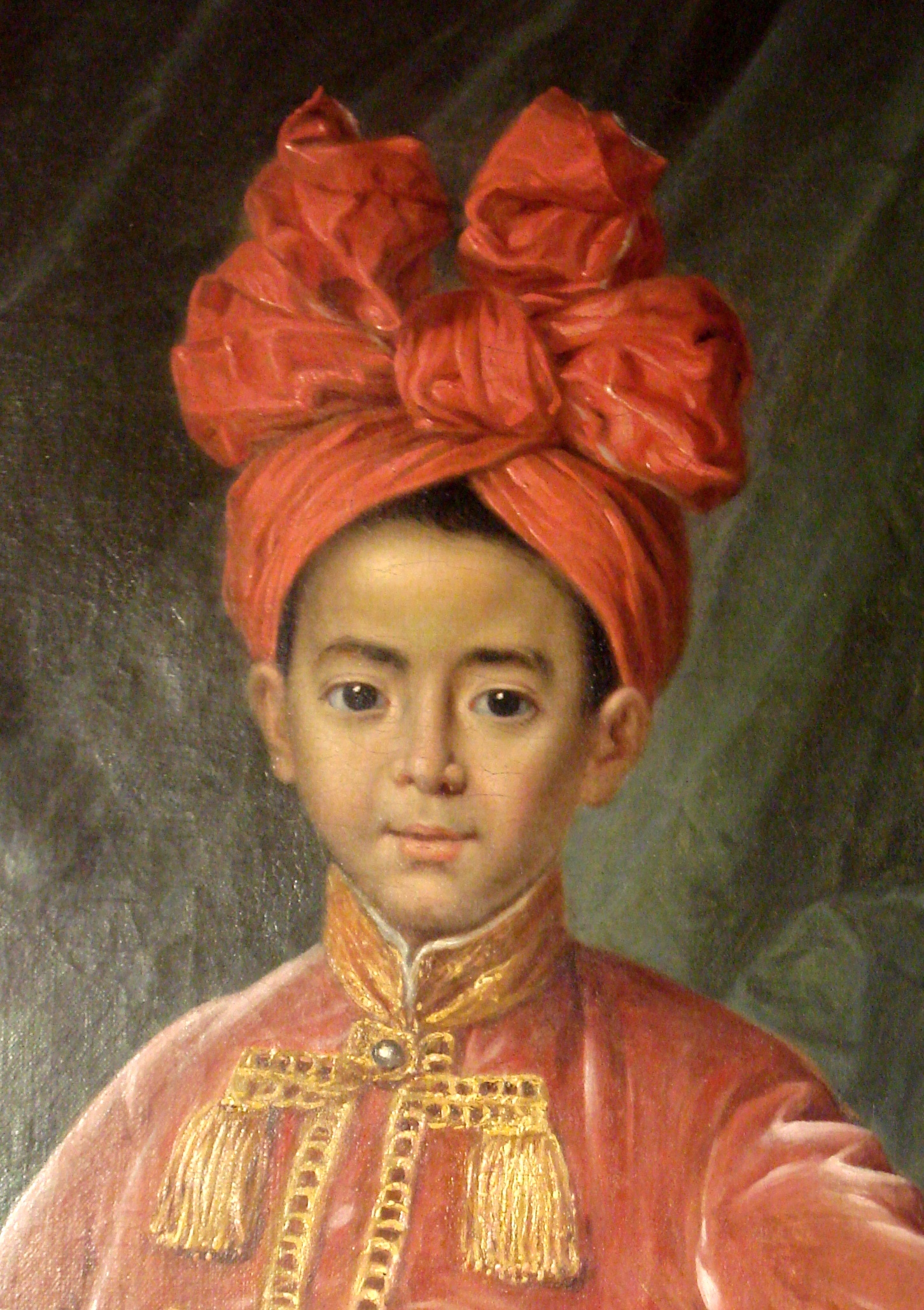
- Close-up of Nguyễn Phúc Cảnh, at the age of seven, in Paris, France. Painting in 1787 by Maupérin, located at the Paris Foreign Missions Society.

Crown Prince of Nguyễn lord
- Tenure: 1793 – 1801
- Born: April 6, 1780
- Died: March 20, 1801 (aged 20)
- Spouse: Tống Thị Quyên
- Issue: Nguyễn Phúc Mỹ Đường; Nguyễn Phúc Mỹ Thùy
Names
- Nguyễn Phúc Cảnh (阮福景)
Posthumous name
- Anh Duệ Hoàng thái tử (英睿皇太子)
- House: Nguyễn Phúc
- Father: Emperor Gia Long
- Mother: Empress Thừa Thiên

Nguyễn Phúc Cảnh (1780–1801), also known as Prince Cảnh, was the eldest son of the Vietnamese Prince Nguyễn Phúc Ánh, the future Emperor Gia Long. At the age of seven, he famously visited France with the French Catholic Father Pigneau de Béhaine to sign an alliance between France and Vietnam. Although Prince Cảnh was the legitimate heir to the throne, he died before his father, and none of his descendants ascended the throne after his half-brother Nguyễn Phúc Đảm was chosen by Gia Long.

== Life ==
Born April 6, 1780, Nguyễn Phúc Cảnh was the second son of Nguyễn Phúc Ánh and his first wife, Empress Tống Thị Lan (his older brother died soon after birth).

=== Embassy to France ===
In 1785, at the age of five, Nguyễn Phúc Cảnh accompanied the French Catholic Father Pigneau de Béhaine to France in order to sign a treaty of alliance between France and Vietnam, the 1788 Treaty of Versailles. Prince Canh was also accompanied by two mandarins, a cousin, who became a Catholic known as Prince Pascal, soldiers and servants. The party reached Pondicherry in February 1785. Unable to obtain help, they left Pondicherry for France in July 1786. which they reached in February 1787.

The party met with King Louis XVI on May 5 or 6, 1787. The Treaty of Versailles (1787) was signed on 28 November 1787. Prince Cảnh created a sensation at the court of Louis XVI, leading the famous hairdresser Léonard to create a hairstyle in his honour "au prince de Cochinchine". His portrait was made in France by Maupérin, and is now on display at the Séminaire des Missions Étrangères in Paris. Prince Canh dazzled the Court and even played with the son of Louis XVI, Louis-Joseph, Dauphin of France.

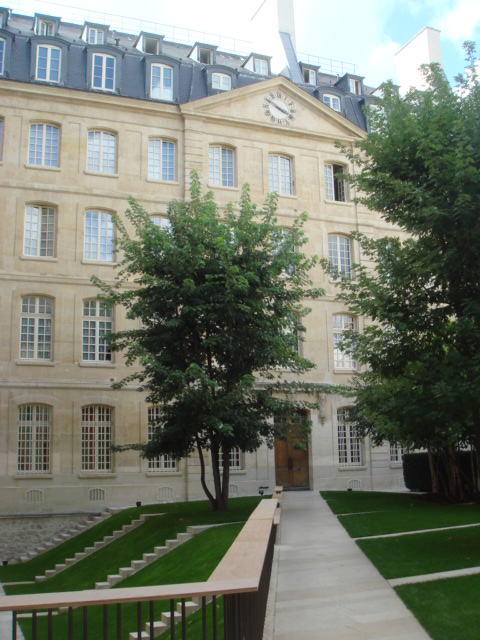
While in France, Nguyễn Phúc Cảnh resided in the 1732 building of the Paris Foreign Missions Society.

Prince Canh became highly favourable to Christianity. He strongly desired to be baptized, but Pigneau de Behaine refrained doing so in order to avoid a negative reaction at the Vietnamese court.

=== Return to Vietnam ===
The party would leave France in December 1787 on board the Dryade, again staying in Pondicherry from May 1788 to July 1789. After his return from France, he refused to kneel in front of the altar of his ancestors, and painted crosses on Buddhist statues. He would regularly attend Catholic mass, but was not formally baptized although he wished to.

In 1793, Nguyễn Phúc Cảnh became "Crown Prince of the Eastern Palace" (Vietnamese: Đông Cung Hoàng Thái tử). From 1794 he participated to all the military expeditions, and his father Nguyễn Ánh insisted that he be accompanied every time by Father Pigneau de Behaine. He was besieged by the Tây Sơn with Pigneau de Behaine in the citadel of Duyen Khanh in 1794.

After Pigneau de Behaine died at the Siege of Quy Nhon in 1799, Prince Cảnh made a funerary oration to his former master:

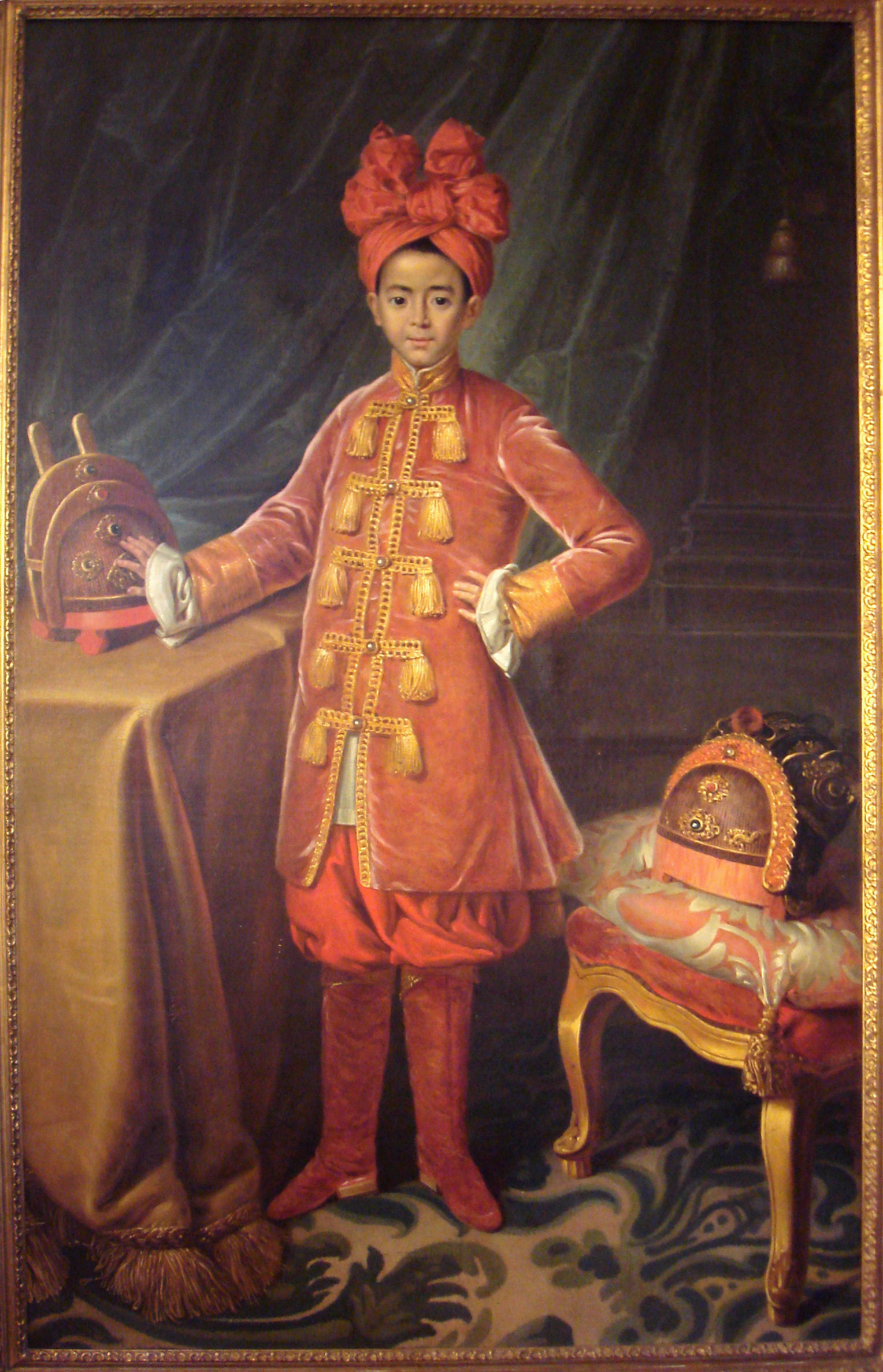
Full portrait of Crown Prince Nguyễn Phúc Cảnh, eldest son of Gia Long, who accompanied Pigneau de Béhaine to France in 1787. Painted by Maupérin, 1787.

"Alas! We had been so close for so many years, and we lived continuously amid war and troubles (...) You devoted yourself to recover the fortunes of Annam, and, as a consummate strategist, elaborated plans for the defeat of the enemy. The usages of our countries may be different, but our hearts weren't, united as they were in the strongest of friendships."

— Funerary oration of Prince Cảnh to Pigneau de Behaine, December 1799.

Prince Canh seems to have been baptized secretly towards the end of his life. According to Vietnamese annals:

"When he lived with Master Vero (Pigneau), he was good, pious and religious. After the passing away of Master Vero, the Prince changed his character, involving himself more in sexual activities with women and drinking. He totally forsake religion. Only when he was near his death, he turned his thoughts to Jesus. He felt repentant and secretly asked a minor Mandarin to baptise him so as no one would ever know.

— Vietnamese annals.

He died in 1801 of smallpox. Missionaries claimed however that he was poisoned. Cảnh was given the posthumous name Anh Duệ Hoàng thái tử (英睿皇太子 lit. "The Crown Prince who is outstanding and forethoughtful") by Gia Long. He was buried in Bình Dương, Gia Định (in modern Bình Dương Province).

As Nguyễn Phúc Cảnh was the presumptive heir to Gia Long, Canh's eldest son Mỹ Đường was next in line for the succession. Gia Long however changed the primogeniture rule of succession to include "testamental measures" (gia thien ha), and ultimately changed his successor to his fourth son, who became emperor Minh Mạng.

== Descendants ==
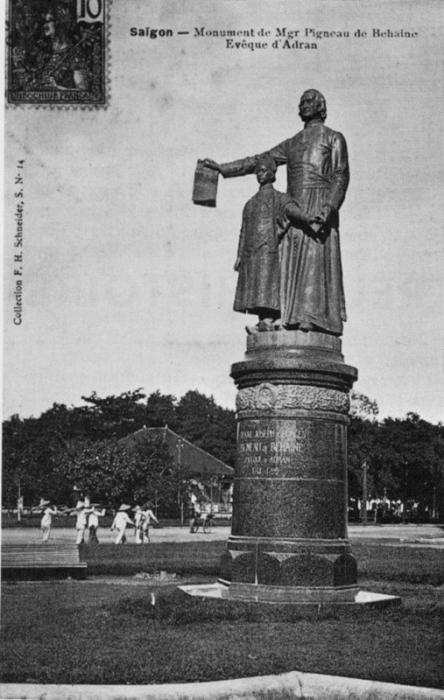
Statue of Pigneau de Béhaine, with Prince Canh, holding the Treaty of Versailles, in Saigon.

In 1824, My Duong, the eldest son of Prince Canh, was apparently accused of incest with his mother (Prince Canh's widow) by mandarin Lê Văn Duyệt, with the result that he was banished from the royal court, while his mother died in prison. My Duong was only rehabilitated in 1848 during the reign of Tự Đức, one year before his death.

The 1833-1835 Le Van Khoi revolt attempted to reestablish Prince Canh's line to the throne. This choice was designed to obtain the support of Catholic missionaries and Vietnamese Catholics, who had been supporting with Lê Văn Duyệt the line of Prince Canh.

My Duong's eldest son was Le Trung, who received the title of Marquis Ứng Hòa Hầu in 1826. Le Trung's eldest son was Anh Nhu (also known as Tang Nhu), who was considered as a candidate to the throne under French rule, following the establishment of the protectorate on Annam in 1884, and once again after the death of Đồng Khánh in 1889.

Anh Nhu, grand-grandson of Prince Canh, was the father of Cường Để, the eldest son of three, who became a well-known independentist and collaborator with the Japanese during World War II. Cường Để, according to the old rule of primogeniture was the heir of the Nguyễn dynasty.

== See also ==
- Empress Thừa Thiên
- France-Vietnam relations
