= Diên Khánh district =

Coordinates: 12°15′17″N 109°5′37″E

Diên Khánh district Huyện Diên Khánh
- District
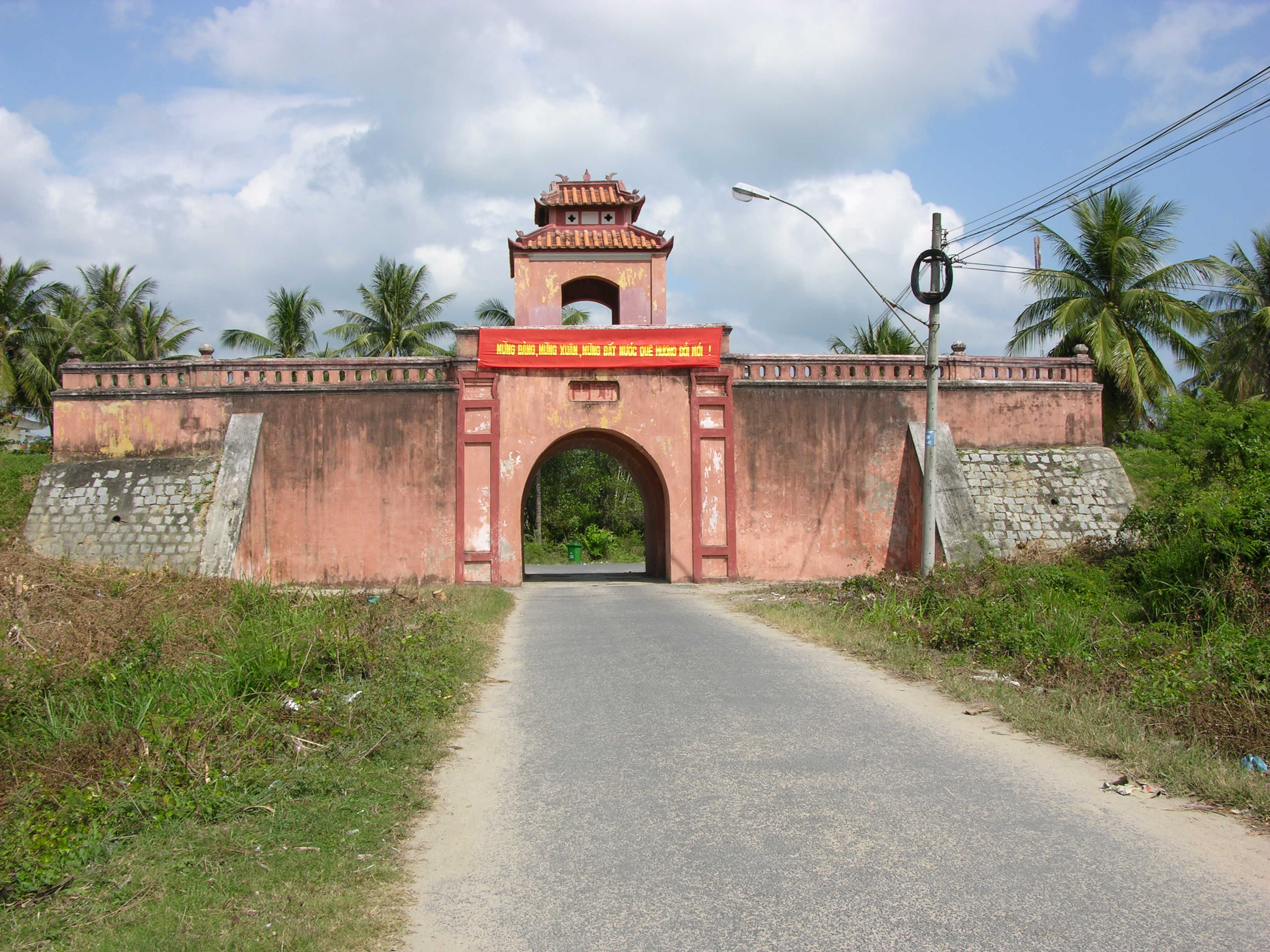
- Front gate of the old citadel of Diên Khánh
- Interactive map of Diên Khánh district
- Location within Vietnam Location within Southeast Asia Location within Asia
- Country: Vietnam
- Region: South Central Coast
- Province: Khánh Hòa
- Capital: Diên Khánh

Area
  - Total: 198 sq mi (513 km^{2})

Population (2003)
  - Total: 134,118
- Time zone: UTC+7 (Indochina Time)

Diên Khánh is a rural district (huyện) of Khánh Hòa province in the South Central Coast region of Vietnam. Diên Khánh is one of the oldest citadels in the south of Vietnam and it is one of the precious vestiges for studying ancient citadels. As of 2003, the district had a population of 134,118. The district covers an area of 513 km^{2} (198 sq mi). The district capital lies at Diên Khánh.

== Diên Khánh Citadel ==
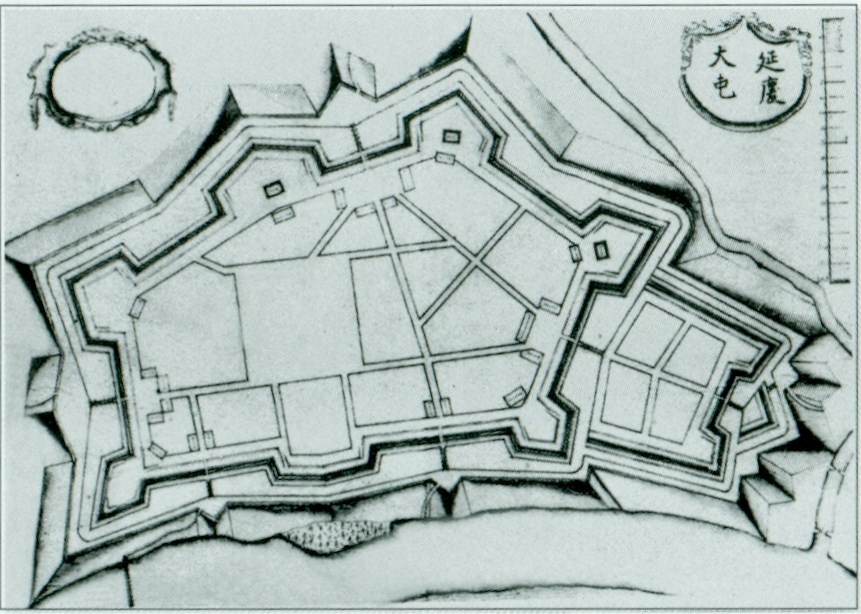
Drawing of Diên Khánh citadel in the Nguyễn dynasty

The Diên Khánh Citadel is situated in Diên Khánh Townlet. The Citadel was built by French officer Olivier de Puymanel for Nguyễn Ánh in 1793 with an area of 36,000 square meters according to the Vauban military architecture which was popular in Western Europe in 17th - 18th centuries.

The citadel's wall was in an inequilateral hexagon with a height of 3.5m. The outer face was vertically constructed while the inner was a little bit sloping by two terraces forming a favorable pavement. Inside the corners, there were large fields which were convenient for military residents. On the top of the corners there stood fortresses 2m high with canons above. On the roof of the citadel, there were closet bamboo and other barricade trees. Surrounding the citadel were moats of 4 to 5 meters deep, 10 meters wide, flooded by water.

At first the citadel had 6 gates but now only 4 remain which are the East Gate, West Gate, Front Gate (to the south) and Back Gate (to the north). There was also a royal palace, private residents of feudal mandarins, warehouses and jails.

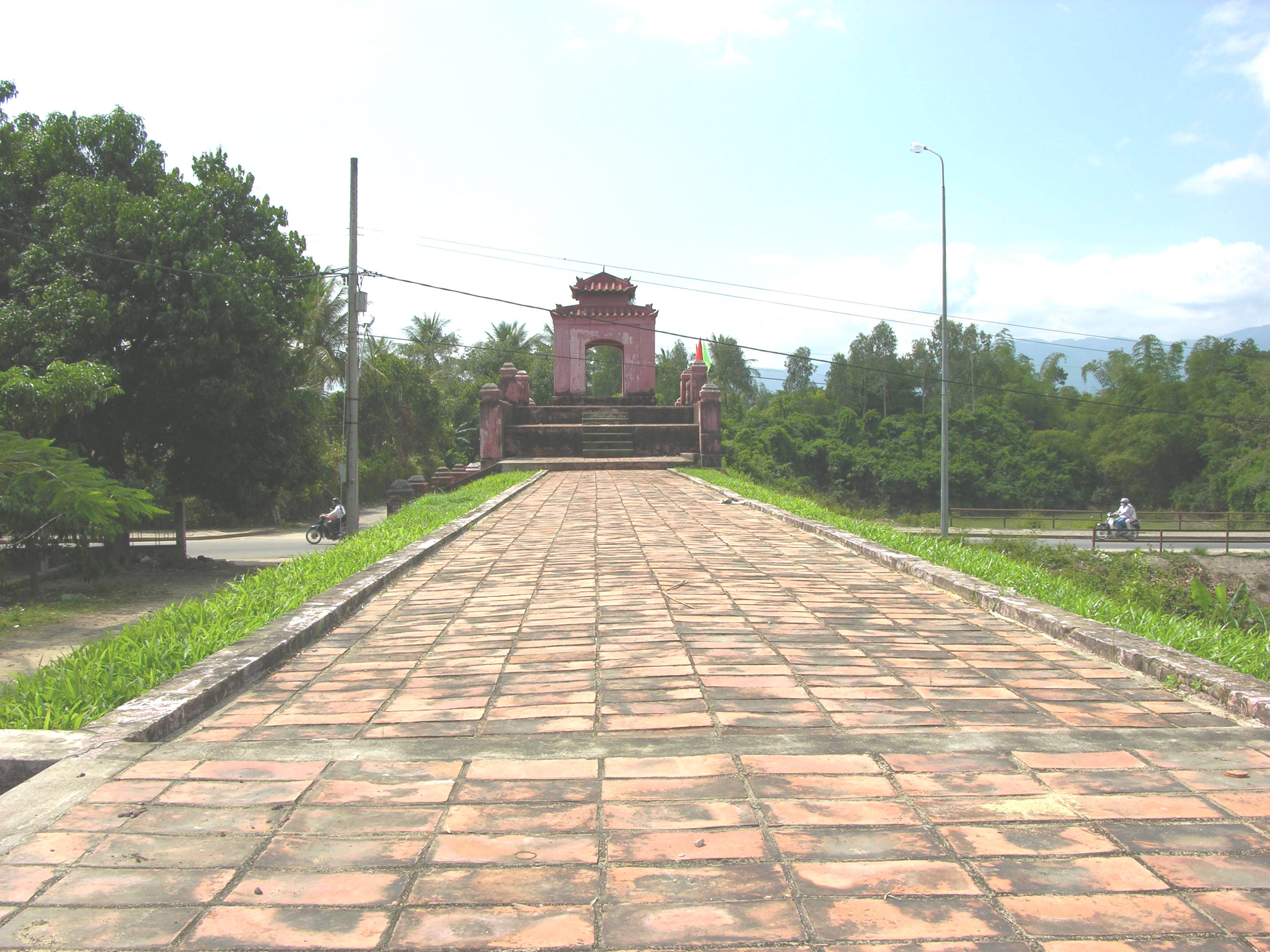
Wall leading to the Western gate

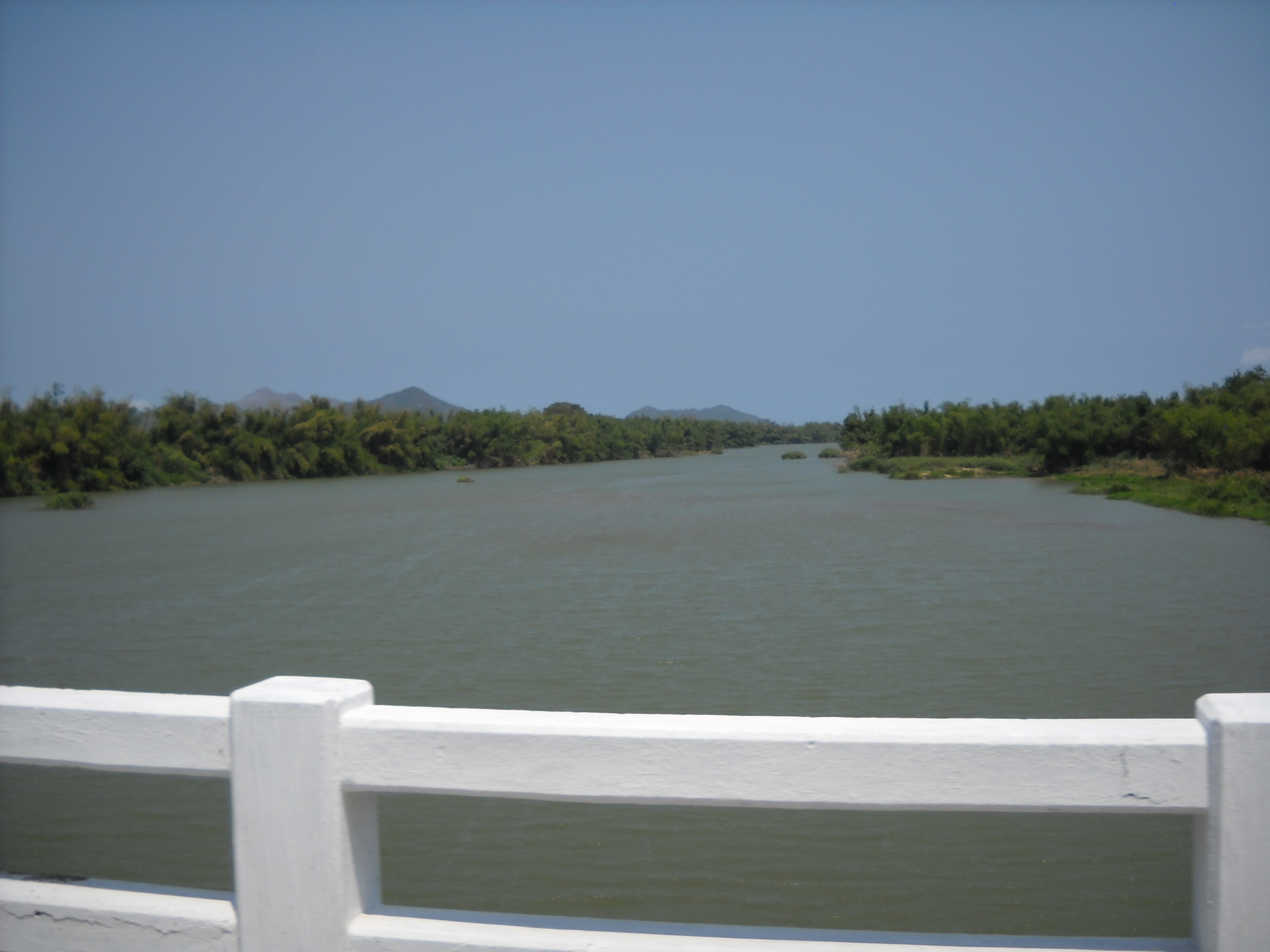
Cái River

== Gallery ==
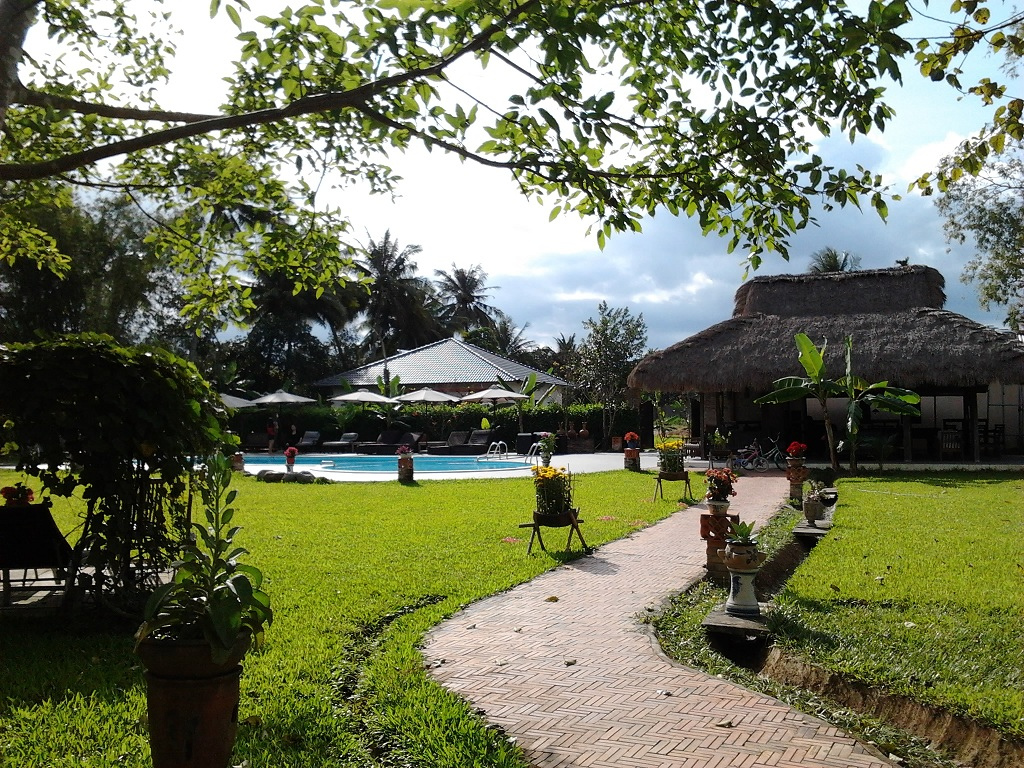
1 resort in Diên Khánh

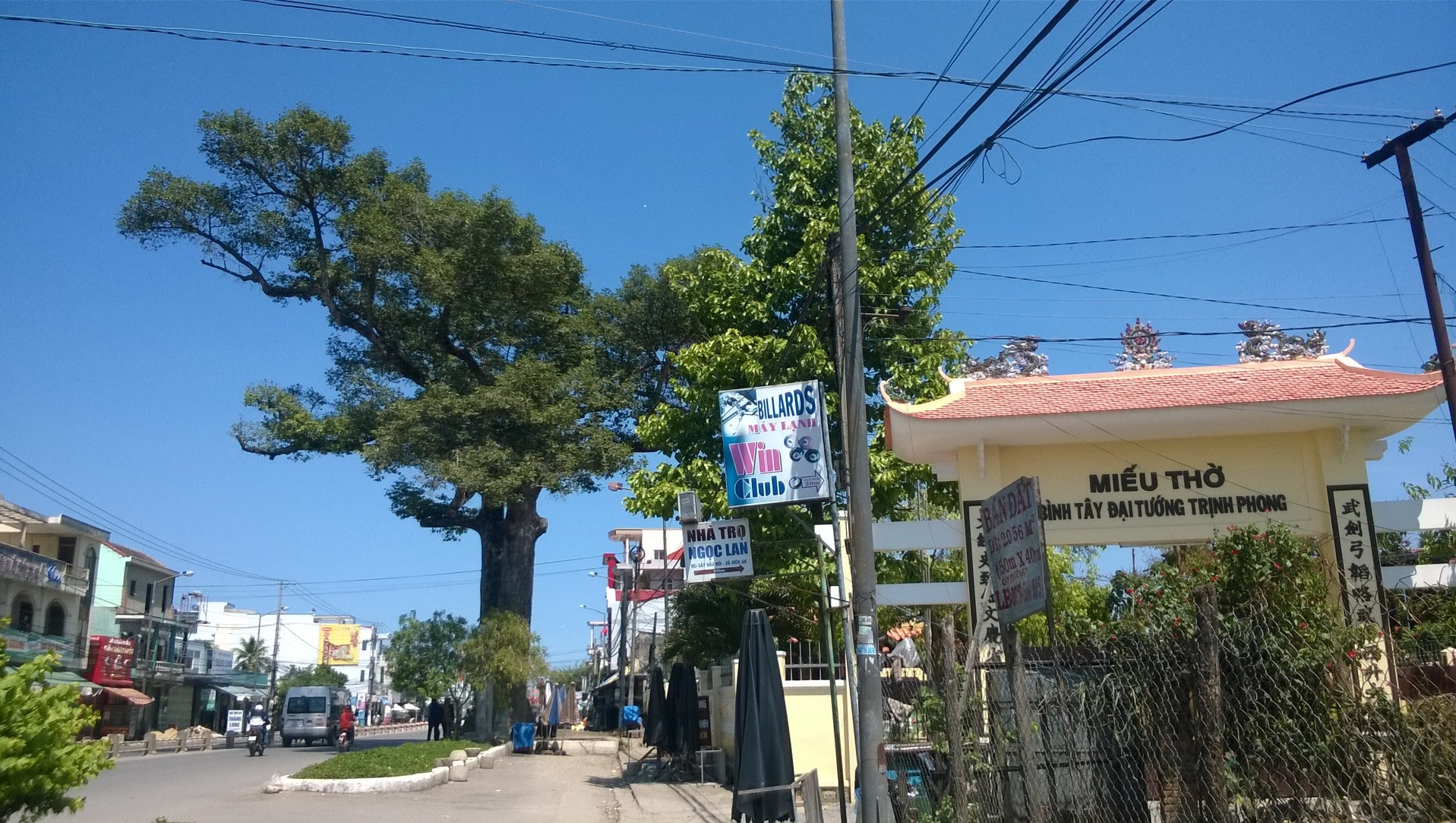
Double oil tree (left) and Trịnh Phong shrine

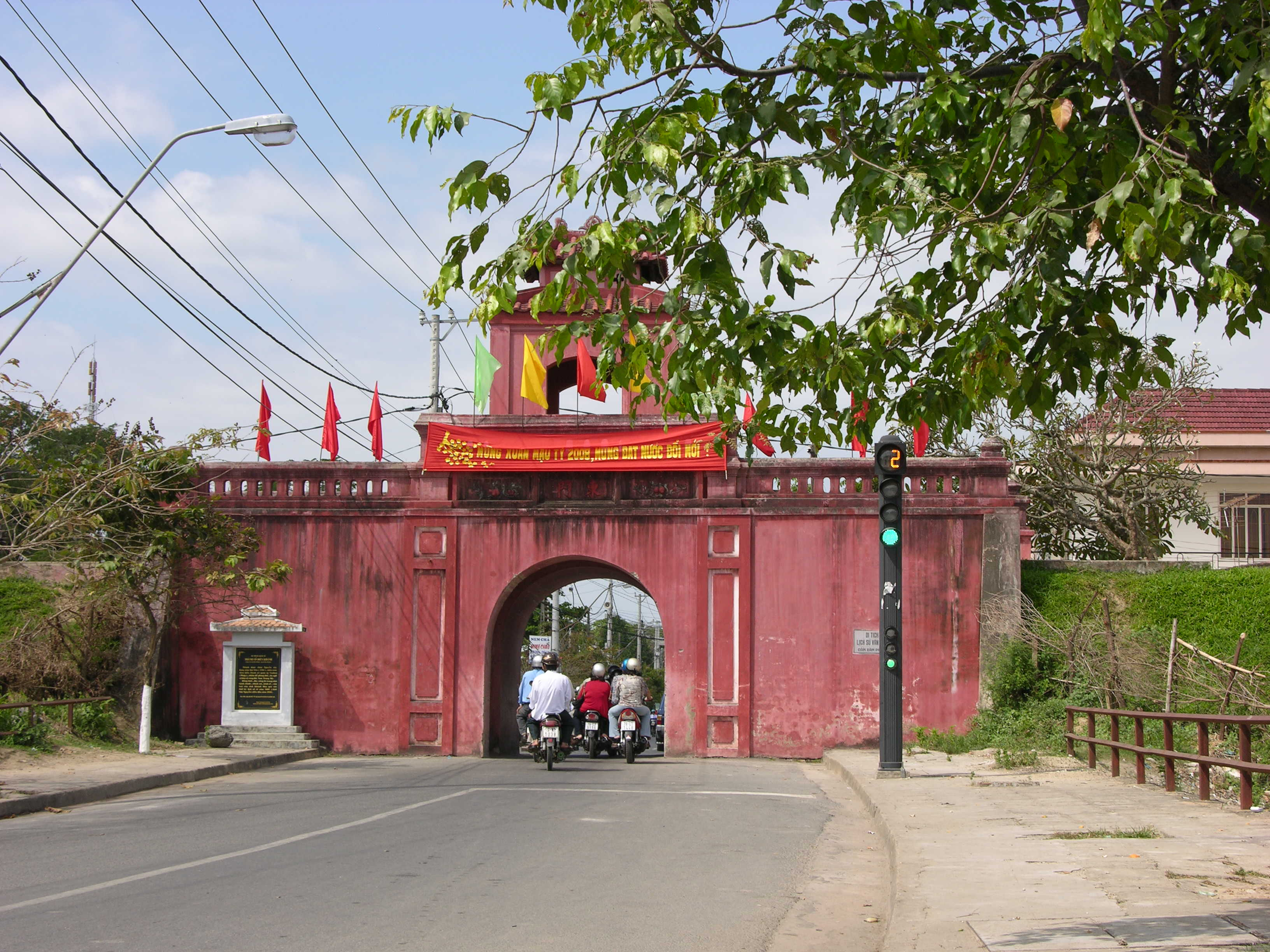
Eastern city gate of Diên Khánh town

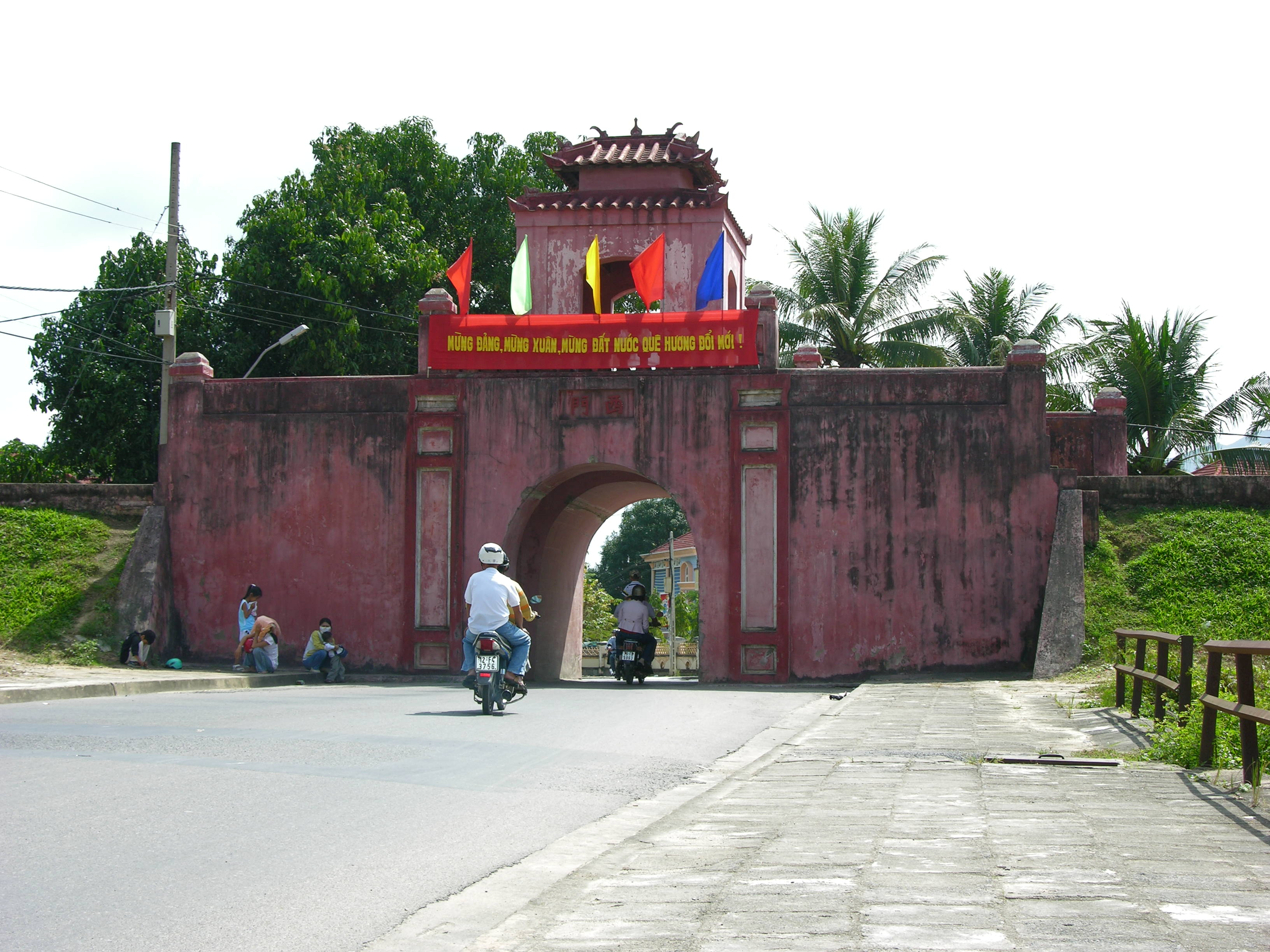
Cổng Tây thành cổ Diên Khánh
