= Jean-Louis Taberd =

French missionary (1794–1840)

Jean-Louis Taberd MEP
- Vicar Apostolic of Cochin
- Church: Catholic Church
- See: Vicariate Apostolic of Cochin
- In office: 18 September 1827 – 31 July 1840
- Predecessor: Jean de Labartette
- Successor: Étienne-Théodore Cuenot
- Other posts: Vicar Apostolic of Bengal (1838-1840); Titular Bishop of Isauropolis (1827-1840)

Orders
- Ordination: 27 April 1817
- Consecration: 30 May 1830 by Esprit-Marie-Joseph Florens

Personal details
- Born: 18 June 1794 Saint-Étienne, Loire, French Republic
- Died: 31 July 1840 (aged 46)

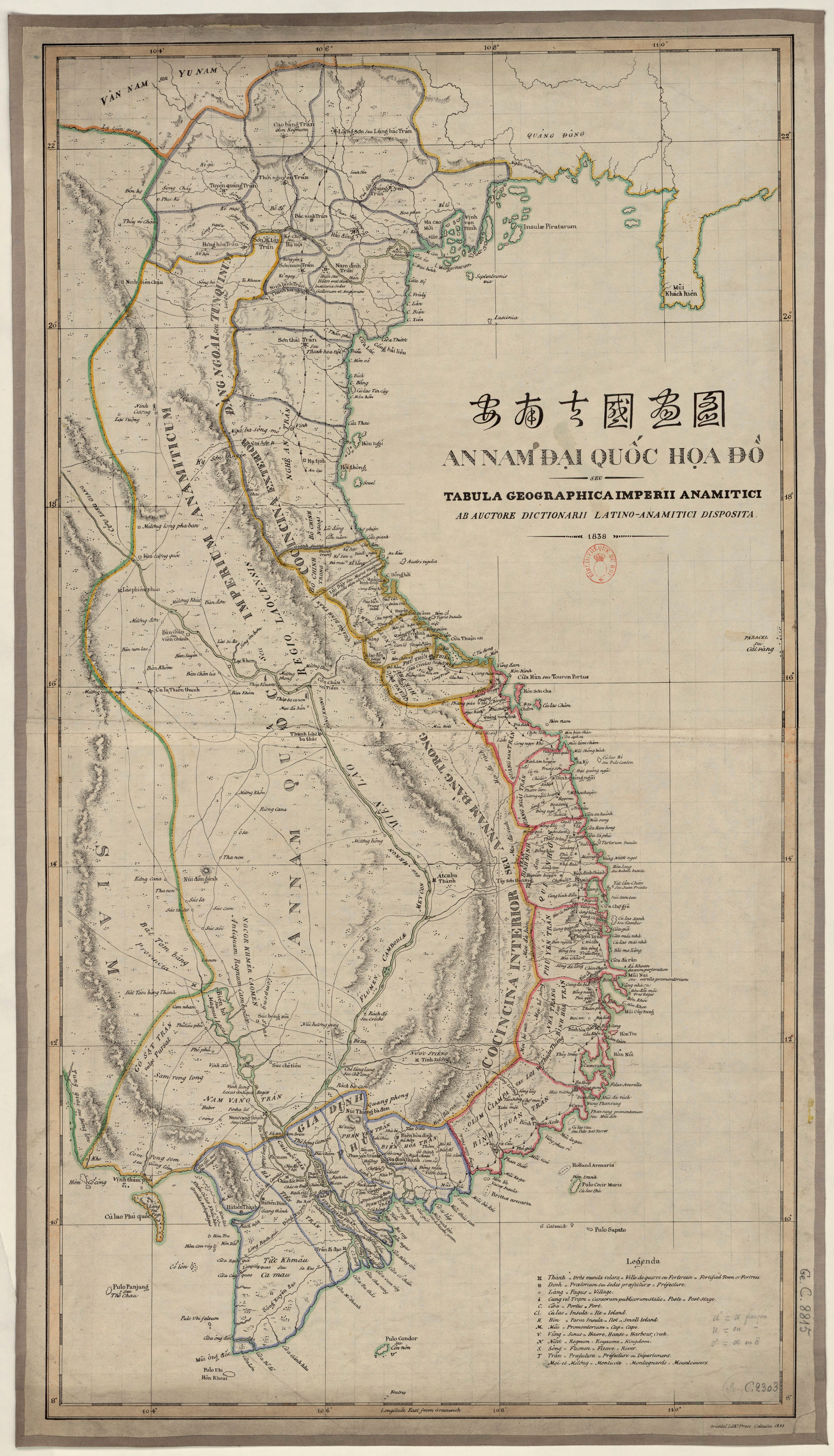
Taberd's 1838 map of "Cocincina Interior" (Đàng Trong) and "Cocincina Exterior" (Đàng Ngoài)

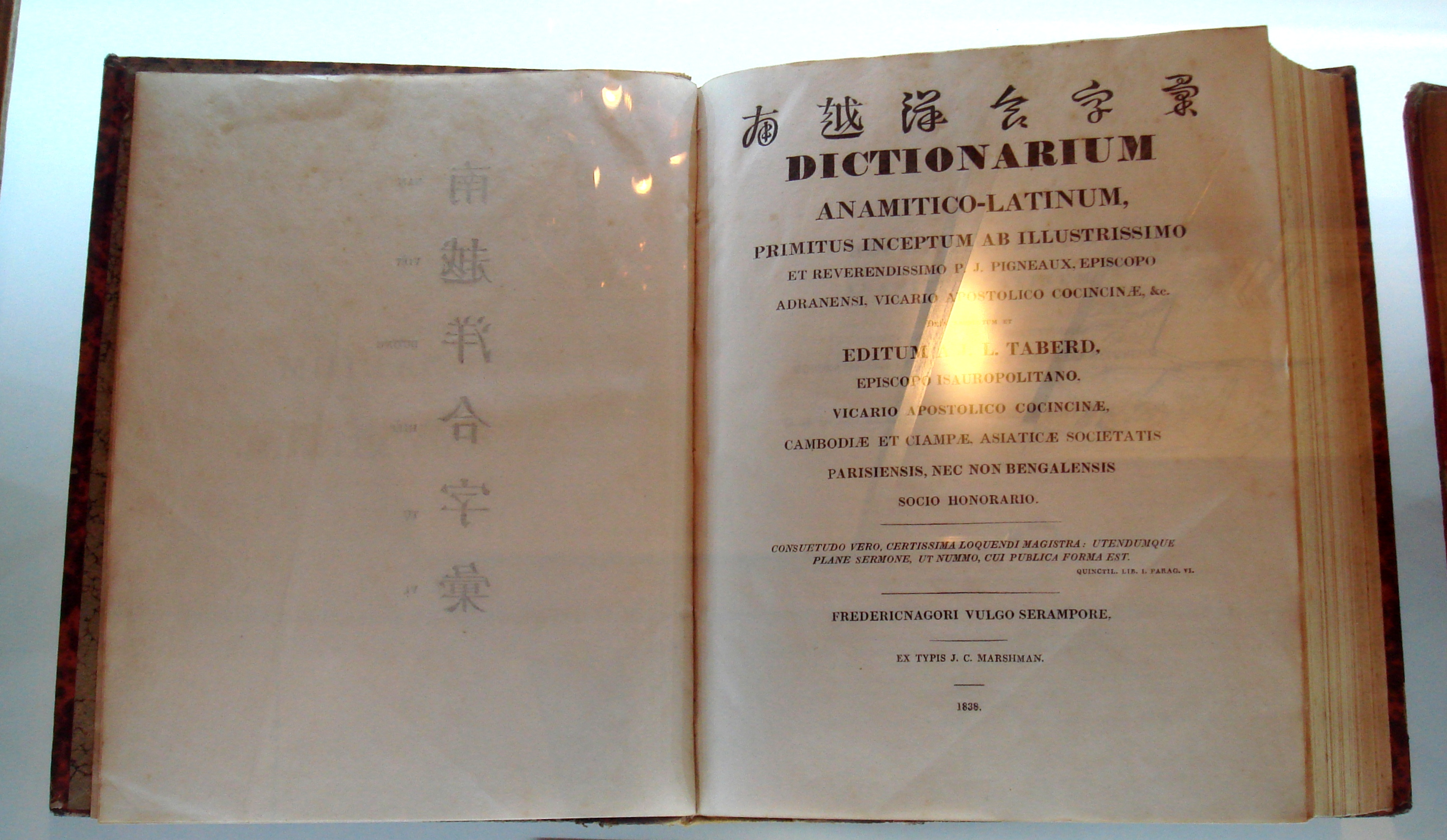
The 1838 Dictionarium Anamitico-Latinum.

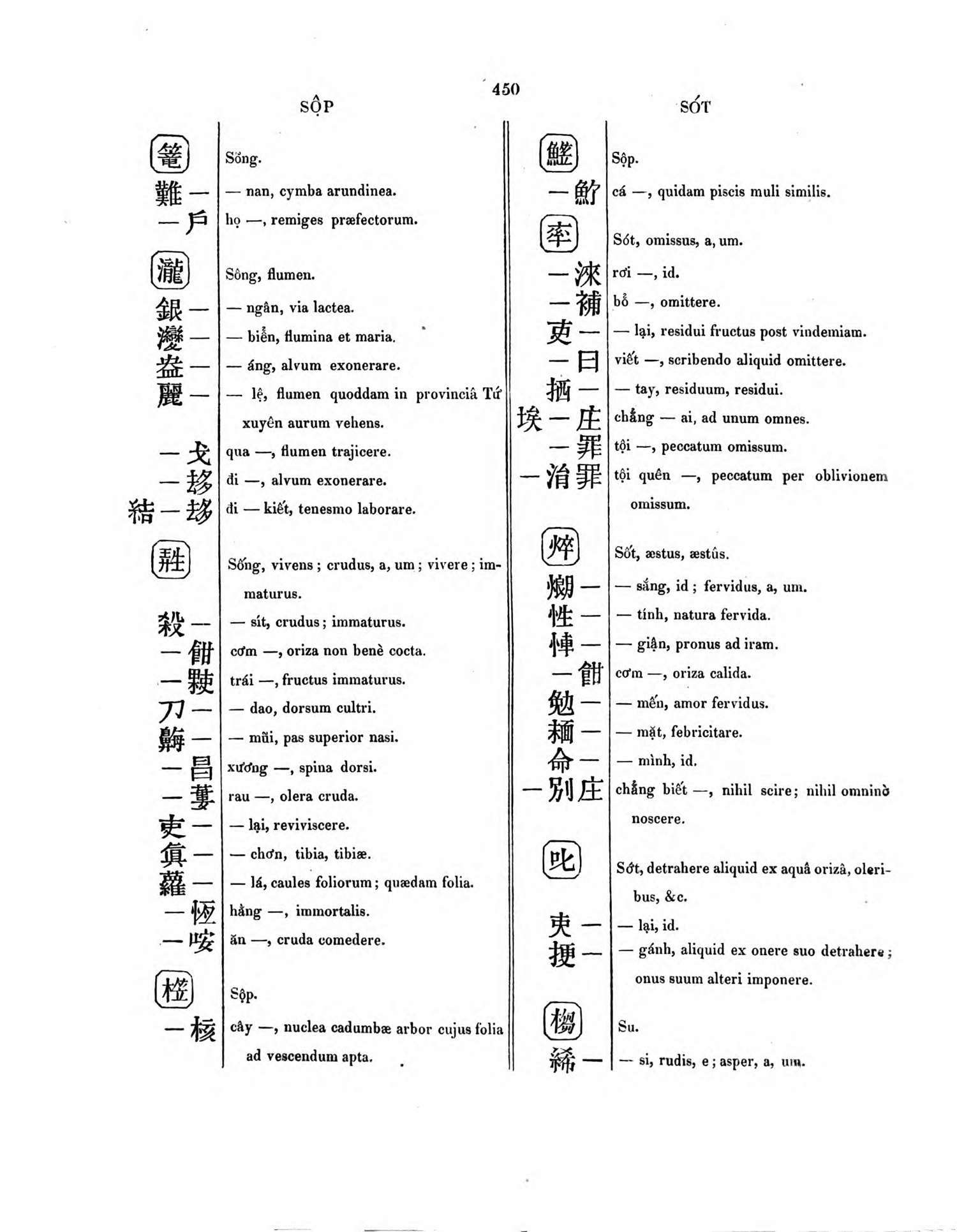
A page of Jean-Louis Taberd's 1838 Vietnamese-Latin dictionary (Dictionarium Anamitico-Latinum), based on the manuscript dictionary of Pigneau de Béhaine.

Jean-Louis Taberd (1794–1840) was a French missionary of the Paris Foreign Missions Society, apostolic vicar of Cochinchina, and titular bishop of Isauropolis, in partibus infidelium. He edited and published the Dictionarium Anamitico-Latinum, building upon earlier efforts by Pierre Pigneau de Béhaine and Vietnamese Catholics.

== Career ==
Born in Saint-Étienne, Jean-Louis Taberd was ordained priest in Lyon in 1817. He joined the Paris Foreign Missions Society in 1820, and was appointed to become a missionary in Cochinchina, (Note: Jean-Louis Taberd was likely among the first to explain the meaning of "Cochin China" in his 1837 scientific article.) modern Vietnam. In 1827 he was appointed Vicar Apostolic of Cochinchina, and Bishop of the titular see of Isauropolis in 1830. With the persecutions of the Emperor of Vietnam Minh Mạng, Mgr Taberd was forced to escape the country.

Jean-Louis Taberd first went to Penang and then Calcutta, where, with the help of Lord Auckland and the Asiatic Society he was able to publish his own Latin-Vietnamese dictionary in 1838. He improved upon the previous works of Alexandre de Rhodes and Pigneau de Béhaine, whose 1773 Vietnamese-Latin dictionary he had been handed in manuscript form. He also published Pigneau's dictionary in 1838 under the name Dictionarium Anamitico-Latinum.

In his work The Geography of Cochin China, Taberd reports the Paracel Islands (today a hotly disputed island territory in Southeast Asia) as having been conquered and claimed by Emperor Gia Long in 1816.

== Legacy ==
In the late 19th century, the renowned Catholic Institution Taberd (vi) was founded in Saigon by the Brothers of the Christian Schools and, since 1943, to educate a Vietnamese elite.

== Works ==
- Dictionarium Latino-Annamiticum completum et novo ordine dispositum (Latin-Vietnamese dictionary), 1838
- Dictionarium Anamitico-Latinum, primitus inceptum ab illustrissimo P.J. Pigneaux, dein absolutum et ed. a J. L. Taberd, Serampore, 1838
- "Note on the Geography of Cochin China". Journal of the Asiatic Society of Bengal. 6 (69): 737–745. 1837.
- "Additional Notice on the Geography of Cochinchina". Journal of the Asiatic Society of Bengal. 7 (76): 314–324. 1838.
