= Nguyễn Phúc Mỹ Đường =

Vietnamese prince

Nguyễn Phúc Mỹ Đường (chữ Hán: 阮福美堂, 1798 – 1849) born Nguyễn Phúc Đán (阮福旦), was a prince of the Nguyễn dynasty, rulers of Vietnam.

Mỹ Đường was the eldest son of Crown Prince Nguyễn Phúc Cảnh, and his mother was Tống Thị Quyên. He was granted the title Ứng Hòa Công (應和公, "Duke of Ứng Hòa") in 1817. At that time, Emperor Gia Long was on his deathbed and had not appointed an heir since the death of his eldest son Cảnh. Ministers suggested that Mỹ Đường should be appointed as crown prince, a suggestion that the emperor rejected. The old emperor later appointed one of his other sons, Nguyễn Phúc Đảm, as successor, who became Emperor Minh Mạng.

In 1824, Mỹ Đường was accused of incest with his mother, Tống Thị Quyên, by mandarin Lê Văn Duyệt. He was banished from the royal court and his mother died in prison.

In 1833, Lê Văn Khôi revolted against the royal court in Southern Vietnam, fighting for Mỹ Đường's claim to the throne . Phan Huy Thực and Tôn Thất Bằng suggested that Mỹ Đường should be rehabilitated. Minh Mạng took his advice, but banished him again after the revolt was put down. His eldest son, Lệ Chung, was designated as Mỹ Thùy's heir to offer sacrifices to Prince Canh.

Mỹ Đường died in 1849. He was rehabilitated by Tự Đức posthumously.
