= Maupérin =

French painter

Maupérin (fl. 1766-c. 1800) was a French painter of the 18th century who produced works for Louis XVI.

Maupérin was a painter of some reputation. On 31 December 1766, he obtained the third medal of the Académie Royale. He was a member of the Académie de Saint-Luc, where some of his works were put on display in 1774.

He notably painted the young Vietnamese Prince Nguyễn Phúc Cảnh, and Father Pigneau de Béhaine of the Paris Foreign Missions Society, during their embassy in Paris in 1787. These paintings are now located at the Paris Foreign Missions Society.

He also exhibited some of his works at the Louvre after the French Revolution.

== Paintings ==
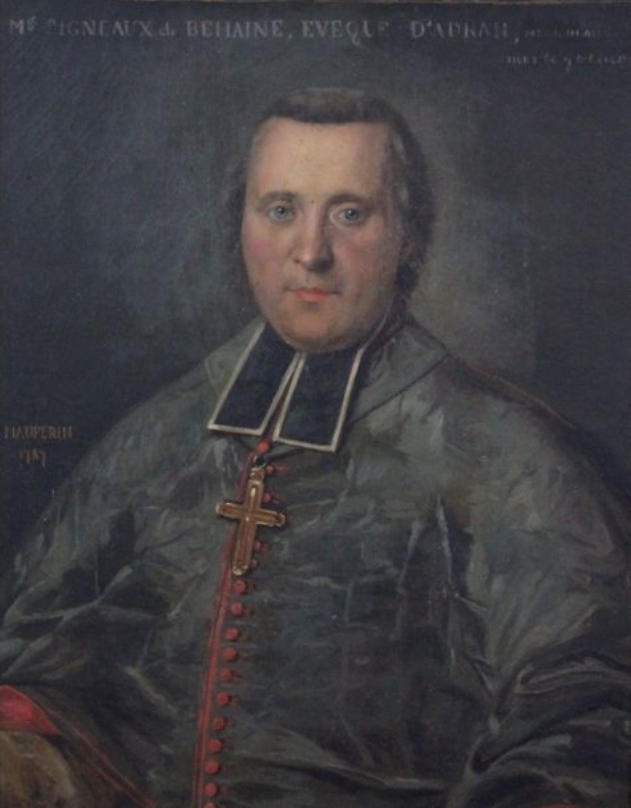
1787 portrait of Pigneau de Béhaine

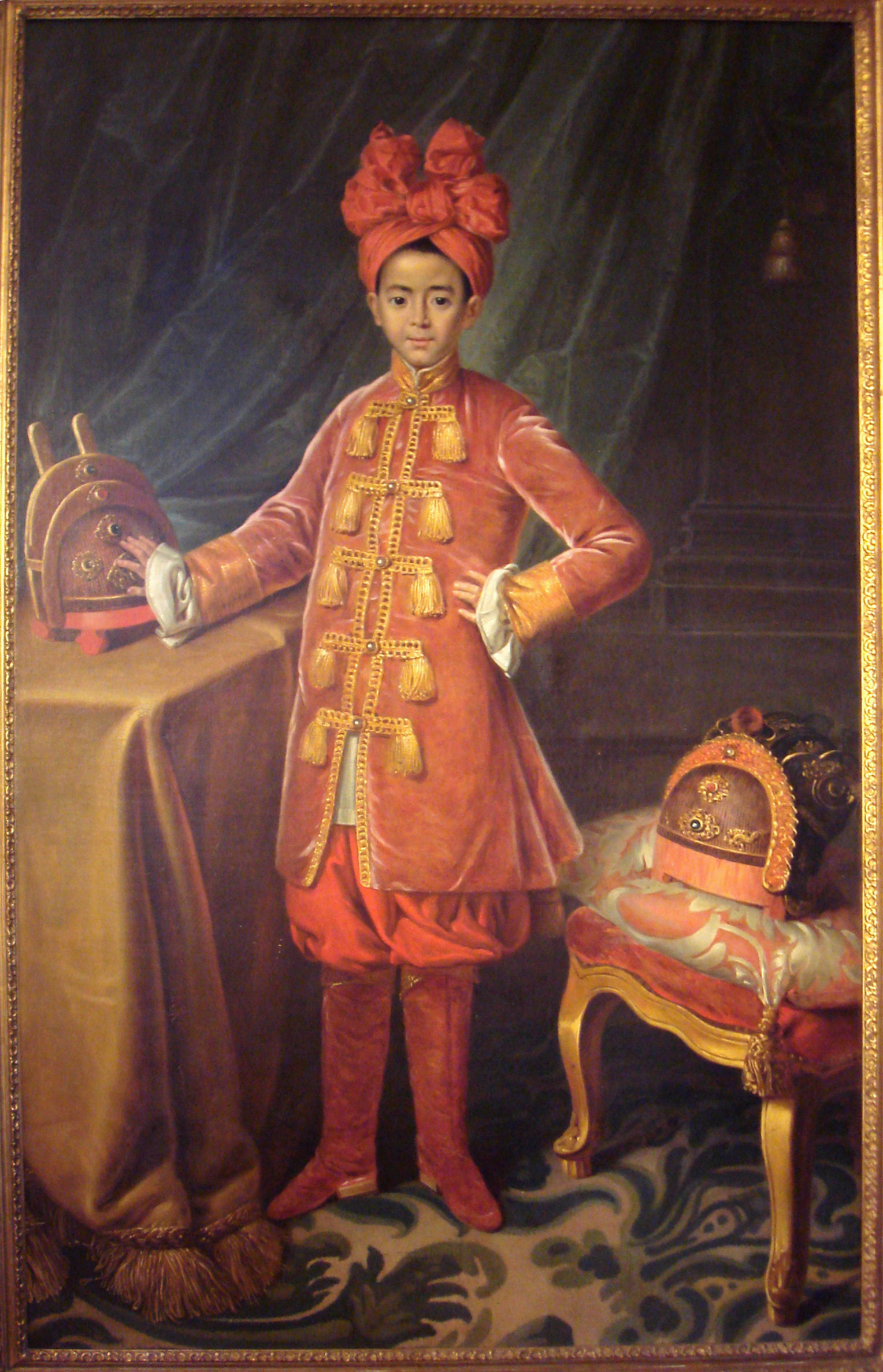
1787 portrait of Nguyen Phuc Canh, eldest son of Emperor Gia Long
