= Jean-Marie Dayot =

French naval officer (1759–1809)

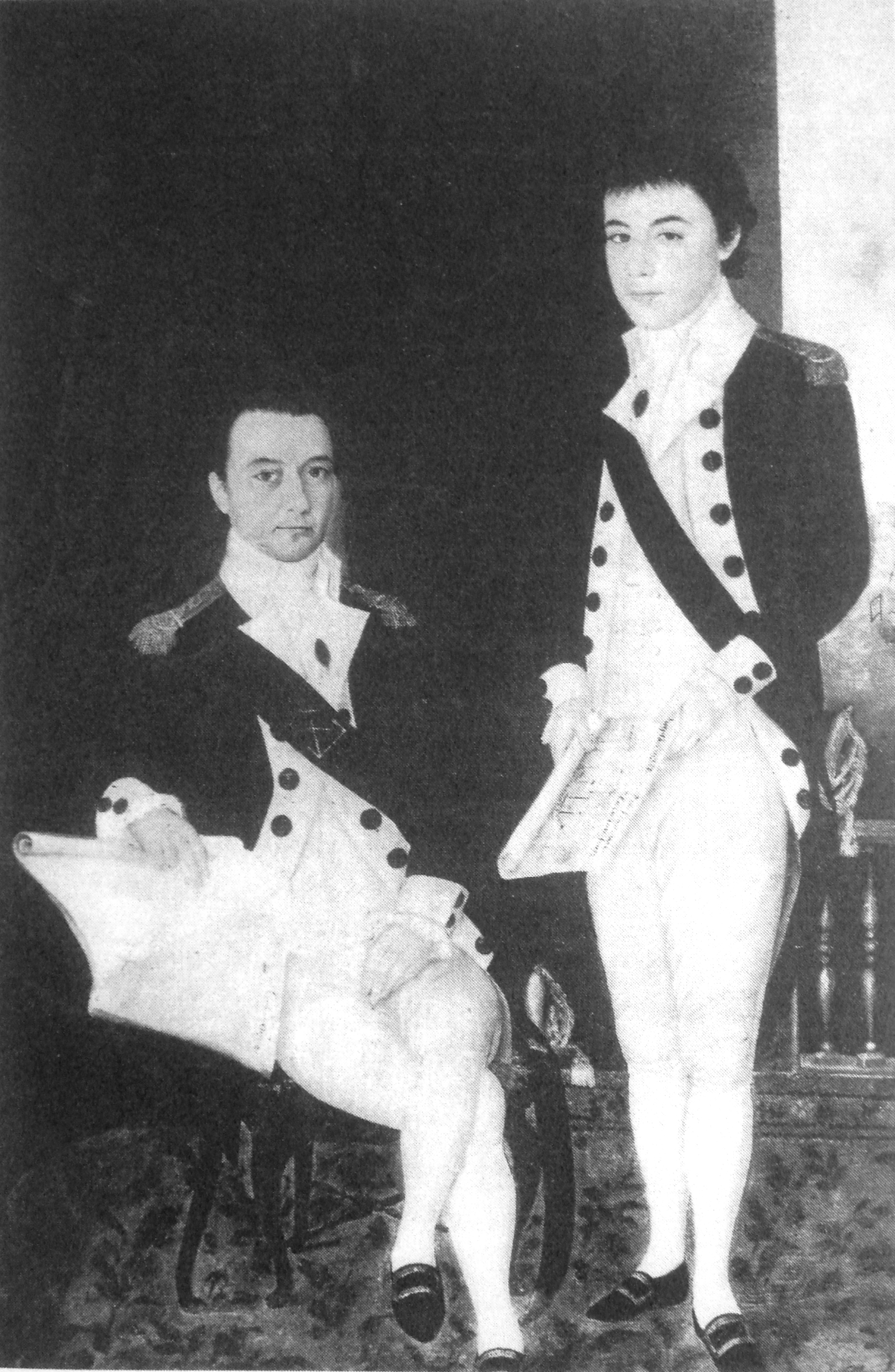
- Jean-Marie Dayot (left) and his brother Félix Dayot (right).
- Born: 1759; Port Louis, Ile Maurice, France
- Died: 1809 (aged 49–50); Tonkin Gulf, Vietnam
- Military career
- Allegiance: France; Vietnam
- Branch: French Navy; Vietnamese Navy
- Rank: Admiral of the Fleet of Cochinchina and Commandant des bâtiments français de l'Anam
- Conflicts: Qui Nhơn, 1792

Jean Baptiste Marie Dayot (French: [ʒɑ̃ maʁi dajo], Vietnamese name: Nguyễn Văn Trí / 阮文智, 1759–1809) was a French Navy officer and an adventurer who went into the service of Nguyễn Ánh, the future emperor Gia Long of Vietnam.

Originally from a Brittany family settled in Ile Bourbon, Jean-Marie Dayot was born in Port Louis, Ile Maurice. He became a Lieutenant de vaisseau auxiliaire in the French Royal Navy. He met with Pigneau de Béhaine either in the Île Bourbon or Pondicherry, and is thought to have commanded one of the two commercial ships which accompanied the warship Méduse with Pigneau de Behaine to Vietnam.

Entering the service of Nguyễn Ánh, by 1790 he was in command of a naval division composed of two European warships belonging to Nguyễn Ánh. In 1792, he fought in the naval battle against the Tây Sơn in front of Qui Nhơn, sinking 5 warships, 90 galleys and about 100 smaller boats. In 1793, again at Qui Nhơn, he captured 60 Tây Sơn galleys.

Jean-Marie Dayot also did considerable hydrographic work, making numerous maps of the Vietnamese coast, which were drawn by his talented brother.

In 1795, Jean-Marie Dayot stranded his ship, was condemned for negligence and put to the cangue. Disgusted, he left Cochinchina.

Jean-Marie Dayot then settled in Manila, from where he traded with Mexico. He died in 1809 when his ship sank in the Gulf of Tonkin. His brother would die in Macao in 1821.
