= Diên Khánh =

Diên Khánh Phường Diên Khánh
- Ward
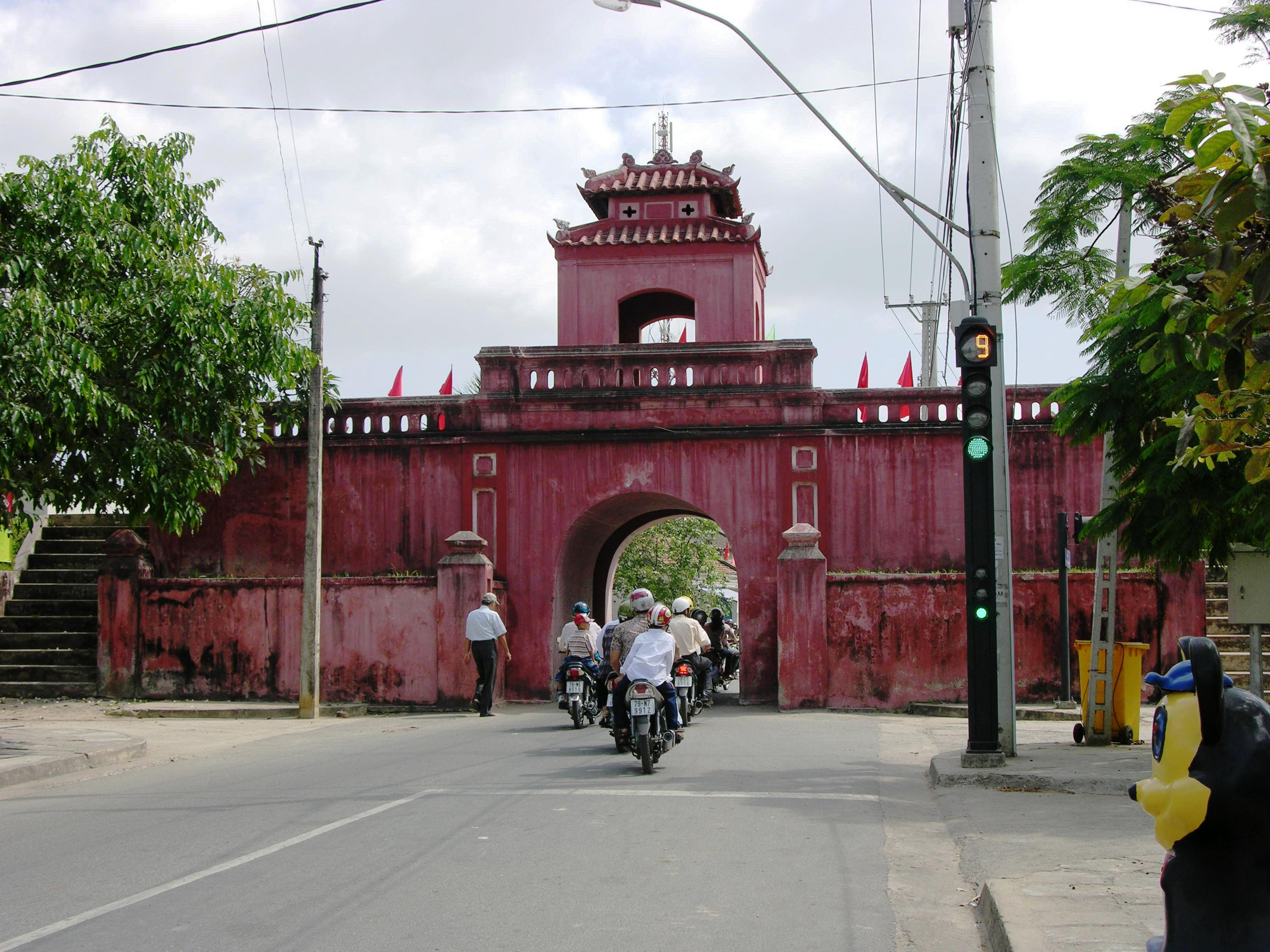
- Diên Khánh Citadel's eastern gate
- Interactive map of Diên Khánh
- Location within Vietnam
- Coordinates: 12°15′21″N 109°5′56″E
- Country: Vietnam
- Region: South Central Coast
- Province: Khánh Hòa
- Established: 1981

Area
  - Total: 1.2 sq mi (3.2 km^{2})
- Time zone: UTC+7 (UTC + 7)

Diên Khánh is a ward (phường) of Khánh Hòa Province, Vietnam. It was established in 1981.

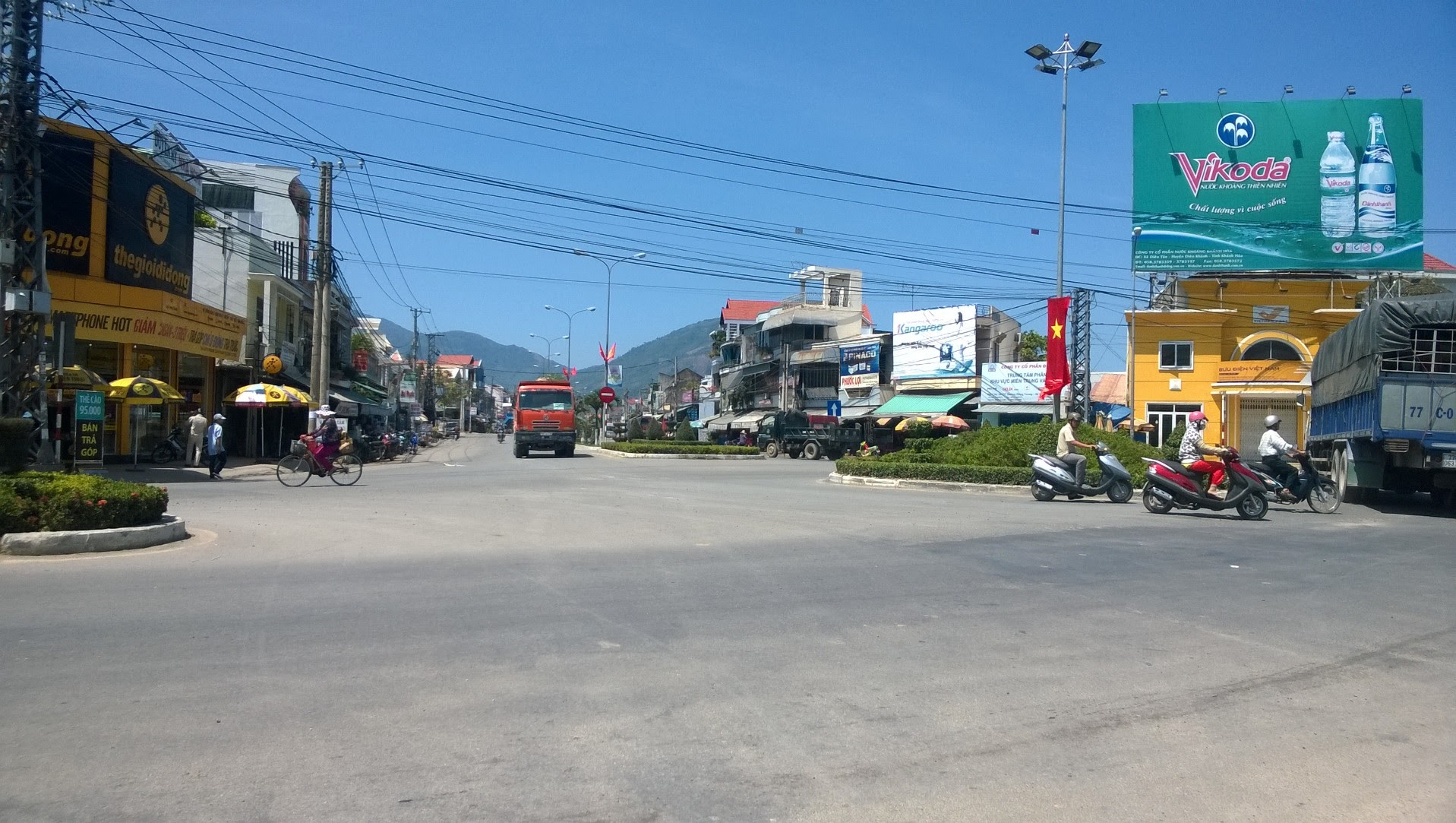
Ngã ba Thành
