= Nguyễn Thị Hoàn =

Ý Tĩnh Khang hoàng hậu 懿靜康皇后
- Empress Dowager Ý Tĩnh

Empress dowager of the Nguyễn dynasty
- Tenure: 1802–1811
- Predecessor: None
- Successor: Empress Dowager Nhân Tuyên

Empress consort of Nguyễn dynasty
- Tenure: title granted posthumously
- Predecessor: None
- Successor: Empress Thừa Thiên
- Born: 1736; Minh Linh village, Hương Trà, Thừa Thiên
- Died: October 30, 1811; Phú Xuân, Việt Nam
- Burial: Thụy Thánh lăng Hương Trà, Thừa Thiên Huế
- Spouse: Nguyễn Phúc Luân
- Issue: Emperor Gia Long; Nguyễn Phúc Đồng, Prince of Đông Hải; Nguyễn Phúc Điển, Prince of Thông Hóa; Nguyễn Phúc Ngọc Tú
Names
- Nguyễn Thị Hoàn (阮氏環)
Posthumous name
- Short: Ý Tính Khang Hoàng Hậu 懿靜康皇后; Full: Ý Tĩnh Huệ Cung An Trinh Từ Hiến Hiếu Khang hoàng hậu 懿靜惠恭安貞慈獻孝康皇后
- House: Nguyễn (by marriage)
- Father: Nguyễn Phúc Trung
- Mother: Lady Phùng

Empress Dowager Ý Tĩnh, born Lady Nguyễn Thị Hoàn (1736 – 1811), was the first Empress Dowager of the Nguyễn dynasty of Vietnam. She was the mother of Emperor Gia Long, the first monarch of the Nguyễn dynasty.

== Life ==
She was a daughter of Duke Nguyễn Phúc Trung of Minh Linh Nguyễn clan and Lady Phùng of An Du Phùng Clan, Thừa Thiên district. She married Nguyễn Phúc Luân and gave birth to three sons and one daughter. After Lord Nguyễn Phúc Khoát died, the royal official Trương Phúc Loan changed his last will to put the young prince Nguyễn Phúc Thuần to the throne, and sent Nguyễn Phúc Luân, who was the real successor stated in the will, to prison. Nguyễn Phúc Luân died in 1765 at the age of 33. After Nguyễn Phúc Thuần lost the throne in the Tây Sơn rebellion, Lady Nguyễn Thị Hoàn's life became relatively uneasy. She escaped to the very far south of Vietnam and spent most of her time in Phú Quốc and Thổ Châu.

In 1778, Gia Long defeated Tây Sơn and unified Vietnam. Lady Nguyễn Thị Hoàn was invited to go back to Gia Định. In 1801, she went back to the royal capital and remained there until her death in 1811. In 1807, she was elevated to Empress Dowager. In 1812 she was elevated to the title as Hiếu Khang Empress Dowager (Ý Tĩnh Huệ Cung An Trinh Từ Hiến Hiếu Khang hoàng hậu, 懿靜惠恭安貞慈獻孝康皇后). Her tomb is Thuy Thanh tomb (Thụy Thánh lăng - 瑞聖陵) at Hương Trà district.

== Family ==
- Father: Duke Nguyễn Phúc Trung of Minh Linh Nguyễn clan
- Mother: Lady Phùng of An Du Phùng Clan
- Issues:
1. Nguyễn Phúc Đồng, prince of Dong Hai
2. Nguyễn Phúc Ngọc Tú
3. Nguyễn Phúc Ánh
4. Nguyễn Phúc Điển
