= Tomb of Gia Long =

Royal tomb of the Nguyễn dynasty in Vietnam

Coordinates: 16.375°N 107.596°E

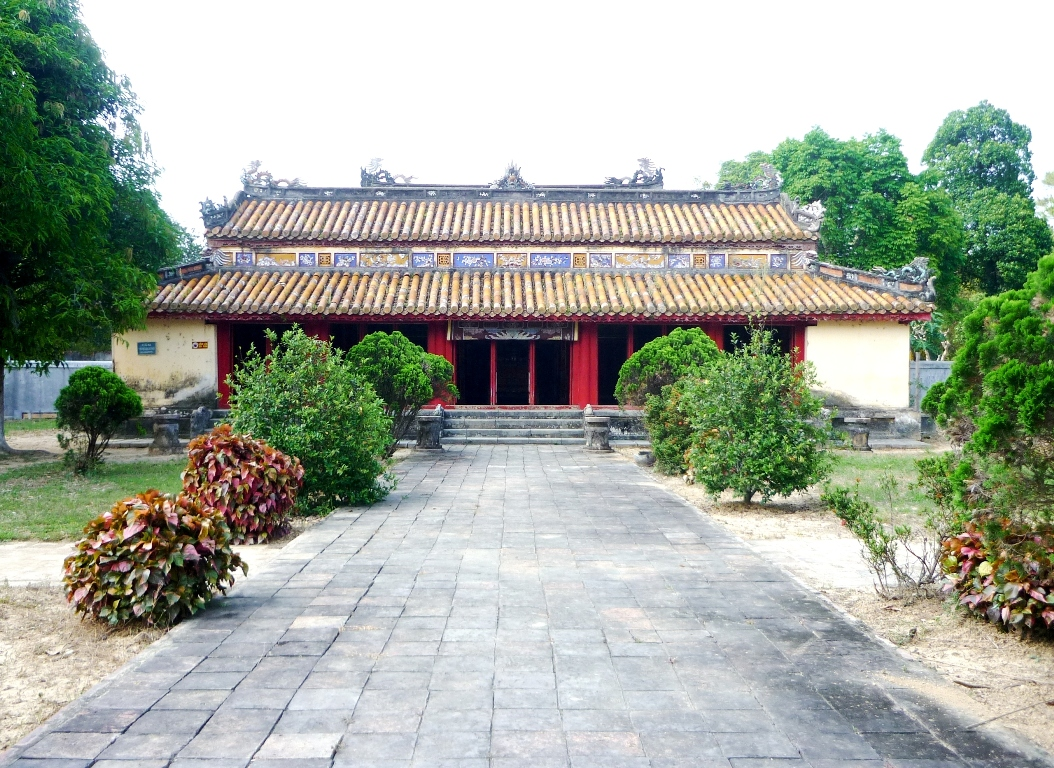
Shrine building

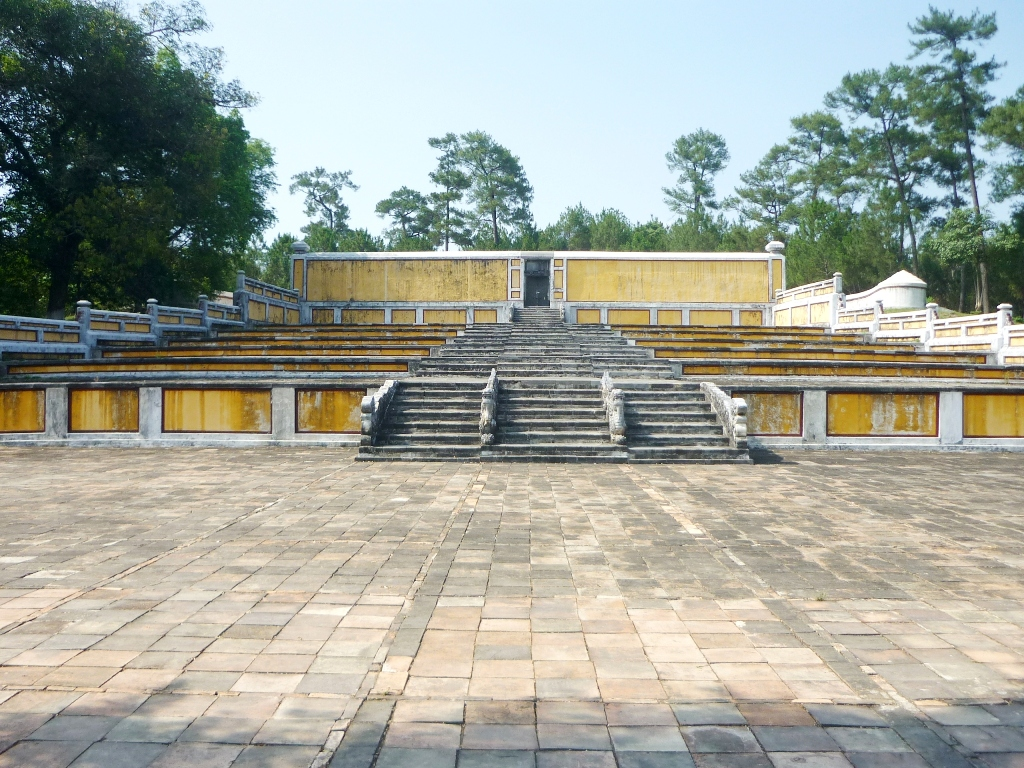
Tomb of Emperor Gia Long

Tomb of Gia Long (Vietnamese: Lăng Gia Long), officially Thiên Thọ Mausoleum (Thiên Thọ Lăng, chữ Hán: 天授陵), is a royal tomb of the Nguyễn dynasty which is located in the Hương Thọ commune of Hương Trà district, some 20 kilometres (12 mi) south of the city of Huế.

== History ==
The tomb was originally built for Emperor Gia Long's first wife, Empress Thừa Thiên after her death in 1814 but later became Gia Long's and some of his family members' burial site. Today, the tomb is badly damaged and some of its structures have deteriorated.

== Architecture ==
The tomb is a group of tombs and was well known for its beauty. The tomb originally had a main complex that formed by the double-grave tomb of the emperor and empress Thừa Thiên in the center; Minh Thanh Temple, the dedicated temple of Gia Long and Thừa Thiên in the right, and the monument of Gia Long in the left. They were built at a plain and large hill of Thiên Thọ mount. On the right lies empress Thuận Thiên's tomb (Thiên Thọ Hữu Tomb) and her dedicated temple, the Gia Thanh Temple, built upon the foothills of Thuận Sơn mount. A lot of Nguyễn dynasty royal family members, including Gia Long's mother (Thoại Thánh Tomb) and elder sister (Hoàng Cô Tomb), were also buried here.

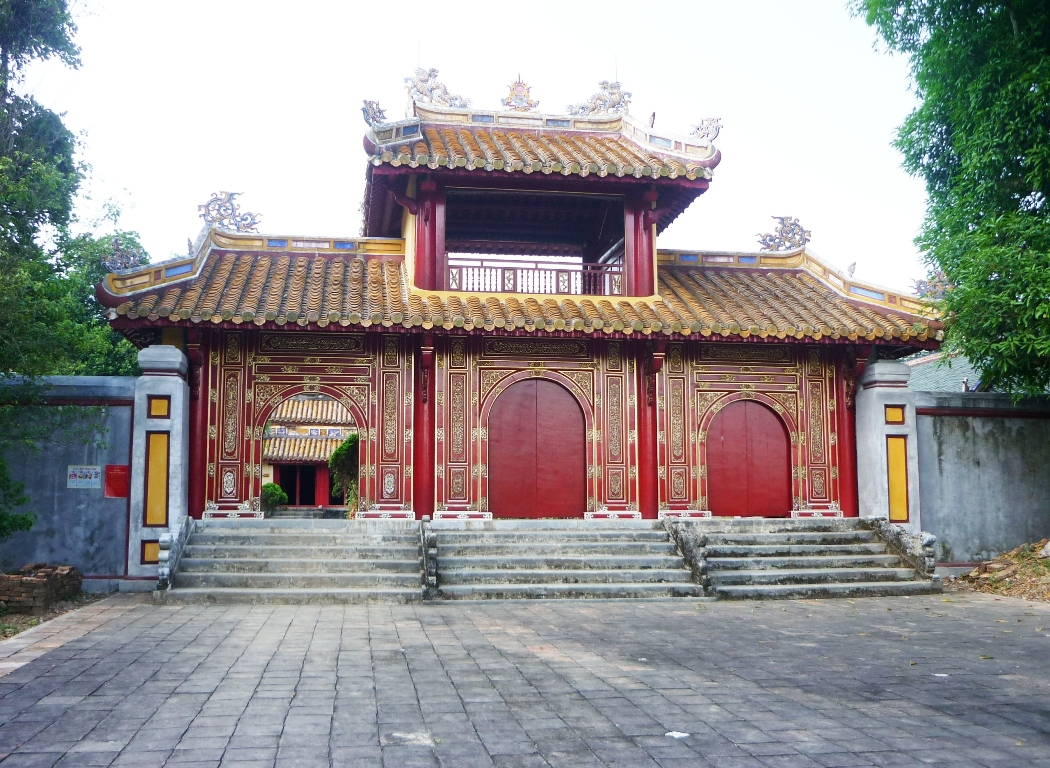
Main gate to the temple

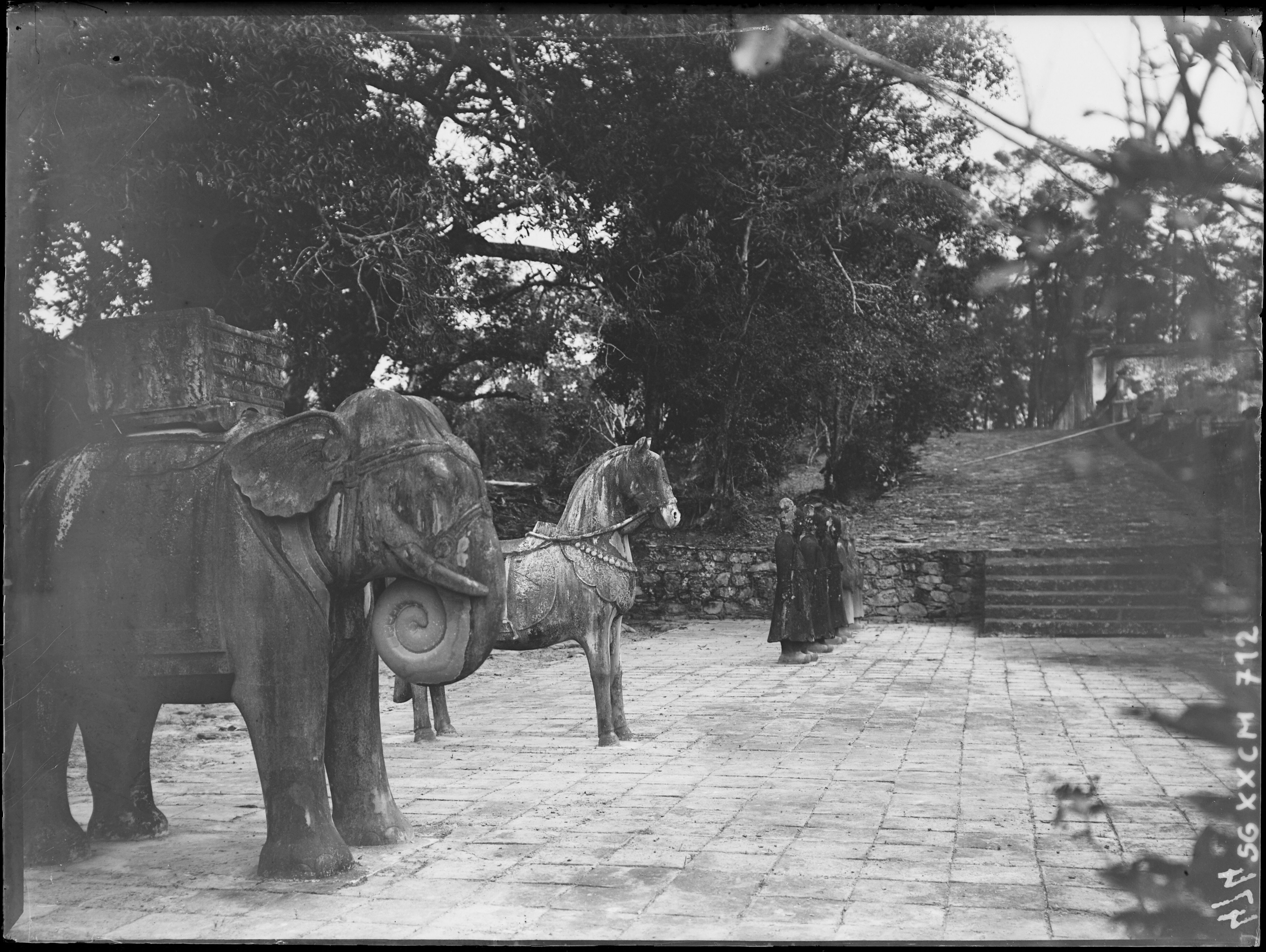
Tomb taken in 1898

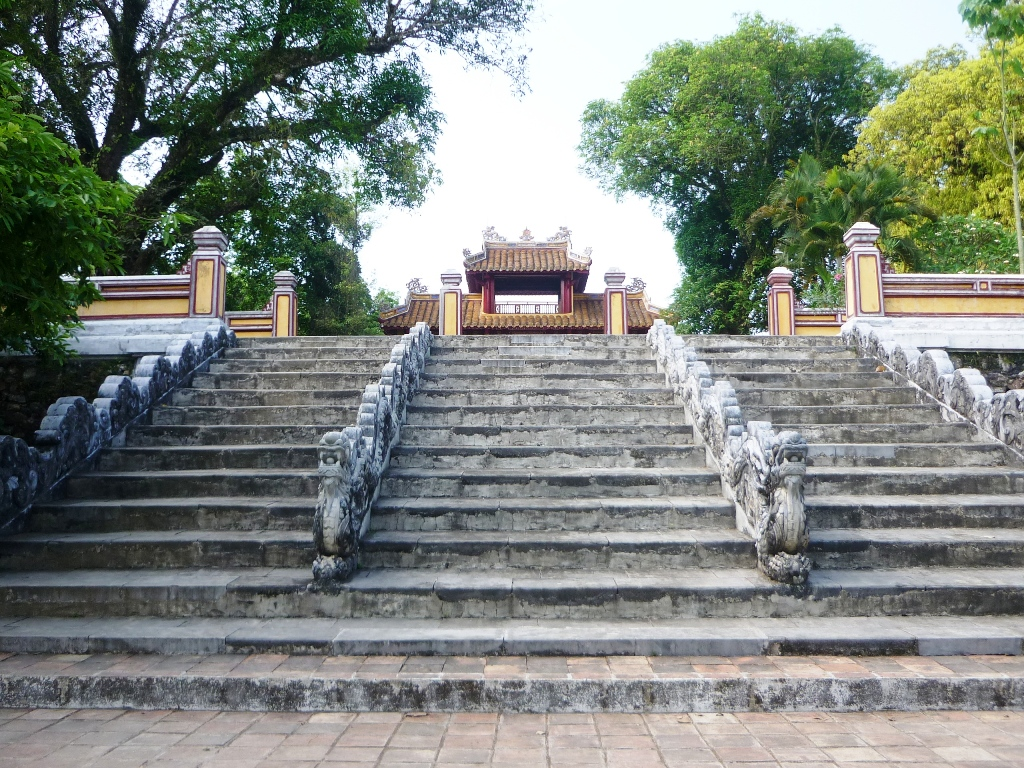
The step to the main temple

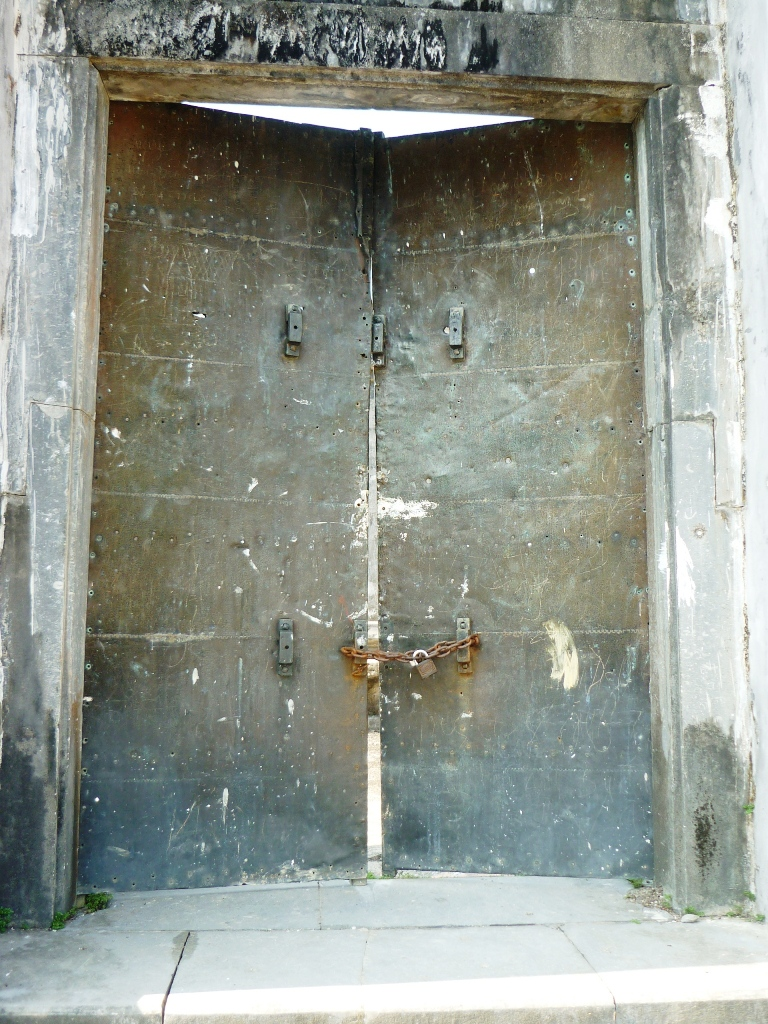
Bronze gate to the coffins

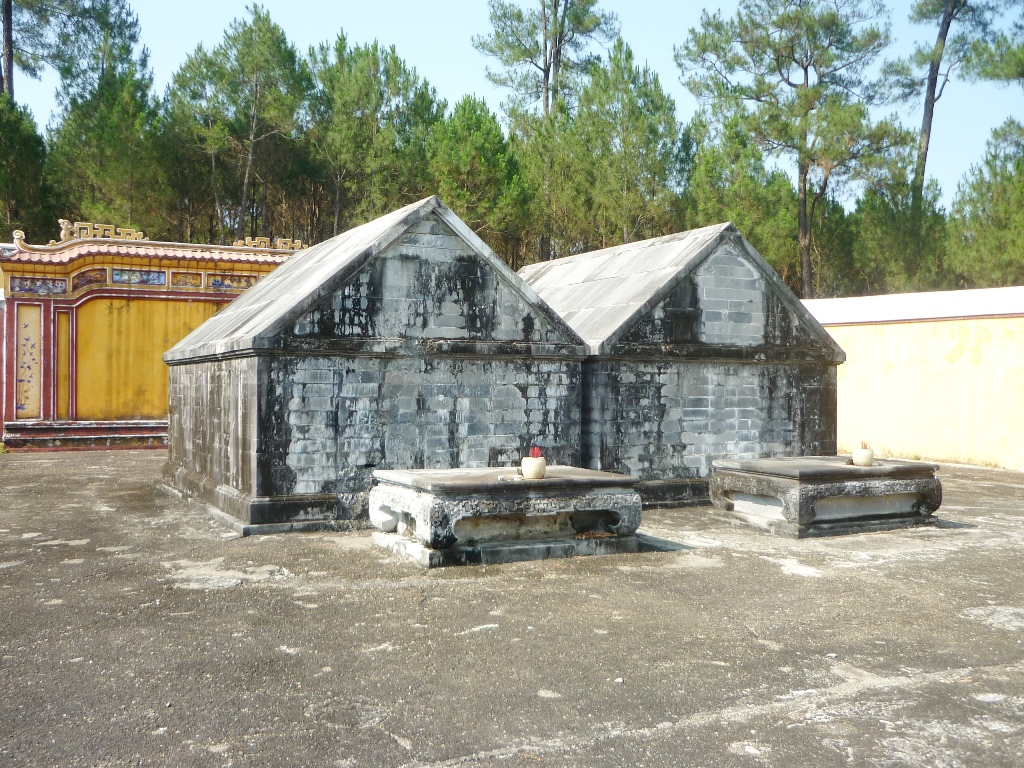
Stone coffin of emperor and empress consort Thừa Thiên

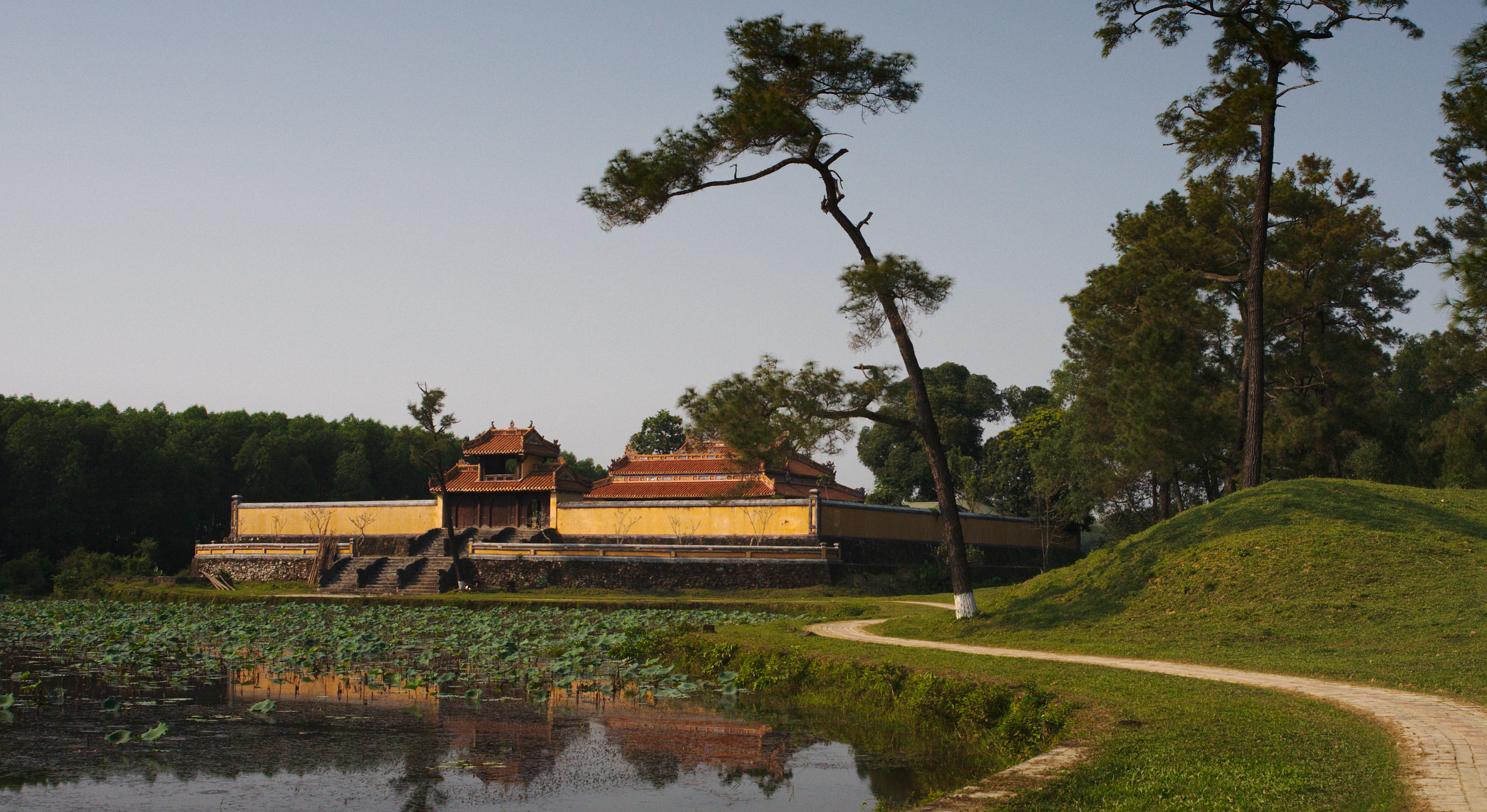
The enshrined temple in the mausoluem

Their burial sites made the tomb's perimeter rise to approximately 11.234 metres (36.86 ft).
