= Empress Trần =

Empress Trần may refer to:

- Trần Thị Dung (died 1259), Lý Huệ Tông's wife
- Most empresses of the Trần dynasty
- Thuận Thiên (Nguyễn dynasty empress) (1769–1846), Gia Long's wife
