= Nguyễn Phúc Miên Bửu =

- Tương An Công (Duke Tương An); Tương An Quận Vương (Prince Tương An of the 2nd Rank)
- Born: 30 May 1820
- Died: 8 March 1854 (aged 33)
Posthumous name
- Cung Nghị (恭毅)
- Father: Emperor Minh Mạng
- Mother: Hồ Thị Tùy

Nguyễn Phúc Miên Bửu (chữ Hán: 阮福綿寶, 30 May 1820 – 8 March 1854) was a prince of Nguyễn dynasty, Vietnam.

He was the twelfth son of Minh Mạng, and his mother was Hồ Thị Tùy. In 1843, he was granted the title Tương An Công (襄安公, "Duke of Tương An") by Emperor Thiệu Trị, and became the teacher of two princes, Nguyễn Phúc Hồng Bảo and Nguyễn Phúc Hồng Nhậm (later Emperor Tự Đức). Hồng Bảo disliked studying, so Thiệu Trị did not like him, and lost his succession of the throne. Thiệu Trị died in 1847, and appointed Hồng Bảo's younger brother Hồng Nhậm as successor.

In 1854, Hồng Bảo plotted a rebellion against Tự Đức and was forced to commit suicide. Miên Bửu was suspected of taking in this plot, but there was no evidence. Feeling sad for the fate of Hồng Bảo, he died in the same year. Finally, Tự Đức decided to pardon him, and granted him the title Tương An Quận Vương (襄安郡王, "Provincial Prince of Tương An") in 1878 posthumously.

Miên Bửu was good at writing Vietnamese poetry. He and Nguyễn Phúc Miên Thẩm (Prince of Tùng Thiện), Nguyễn Phúc Miên Trinh (Prince of Tuy Lý), were known as "Tam Đường" (三堂) of Nguyễn dynasty. He was a member of Mạc Vân thi xã ("Mạc Vân Poetry Society"). Nguyễn Phúc Miên Định (Prince of Thọ Xuân), Nguyễn Phúc Miên Thủ (Prince of Hàm Thuận), Nguyễn Phúc Miên Thẩm (Prince of Tùng Thiện), Nguyễn Phúc Miên Trinh (Prince of Tuy Lý), Nguyễn Phúc Miên Triện (Prince of Hoằng Hóa), Nguyễn Văn Siêu, Cao Bá Quát, Hà Tôn Quyền, Phan Thanh Giản and Nguyễn Đăng Giai were also members of this poetry society.
