= Nguyễn Phúc Miên Định =

- Thọ Xuân Vương (Prince Thọ Xuân of the 1st Rank)
- Born: 5 August 1810
- Died: 5 November 1886 (aged 76)
Posthumous name
- Đoan Khác (端恪)
- Father: Emperor Minh Mạng
- Mother: Phạm Thị Tuyết

Nguyễn Phúc Miên Định (阮福綿定, 5 August 1810 – 5 November 1886), born Nguyễn Phúc Yến (阮福宴), was a prince of Nguyễn dynasty, Vietnam.

== Life ==
He was the third son of Minh Mạng, and his mother was Phạm Thị Tuyết. He was granted the title Thọ Xuân Công (壽春公 "Duke of Thọ Xuân") and appointed Right Director of Imperial Clan Court (Tôn Nhân Phủ Hữu Tôn Chính 尊人府右尊正) in 1830. He was elevated to Left Director (Tả Tôn Chính 左尊正) in 1865. In 1880, he was elevated to Thọ Xuân Vương (壽春王 "Prince of Thọ Xuân"). After Tự Đức's death, he was named as regent together with Nguyễn Phúc Miên Trinh (Prince of Tuy Lý) to assist the new emperor Dục Đức, but they wielded little power.

In 1885, Tôn Thất Thuyết launched a failure ambush against French colonists, and escaped from Huế together with Emperor Hàm Nghi. During the emperor's absence, Miên Định was appointed as puppet "Prince Regent" (giám quốc) by French general Henri Roussel de Courcy. Nguyễn Hữu Độ, Phan Đình Bình and Nguyễn Văn Tường were appointed as Grand Secretaries in the same time. He allowed his two brothers, Nguyễn Phúc Miên Trinh (Prince of Tuy Lý) and Nguyễn Phúc Miên Triện (Prince of Hoằng Hóa) to come back to Huế. In September, de Courcy exiled Tường to Poulo Condore, and installed Đồng Khánh as new emperor. Miên Định retired. He died in the next year, and received the posthumous name Đoan Khác (端恪).

Miên Định fathered 144 children, including 78 sons and 66 daughters.

== As a poet ==
Miên Định was also a poet. He was a member of Mạc Vân thi xã ("Mạc Vân Poetry Society"). Nguyễn Phúc Miên Thủ (Prince of Hàm Thuận), Nguyễn Phúc Miên Thẩm (Prince of Tùng Thiện), Nguyễn Phúc Miên Trinh (Prince of Tuy Lý), Nguyễn Phúc Miên Bửu (Prince of Tương An), Nguyễn Phúc Miên Triện (Prince of Hoằng Hóa), Nguyễn Văn Siêu, Cao Bá Quát, Hà Tôn Quyền, Phan Thanh Giản and Nguyễn Đăng Giai were also members of this poetry society.
