= Nguyễn Phúc Miên Trinh =

- Tuy Quốc Công (Duke Tuy Quốc); Tuy Lý Công (Duke Tuy Lý); Tuy Lý Quận Vương (Prince Tuy Lý of the 2nd Rank); Tuy Lý Vương (Prince Tuy Lý of the 1st Rank)
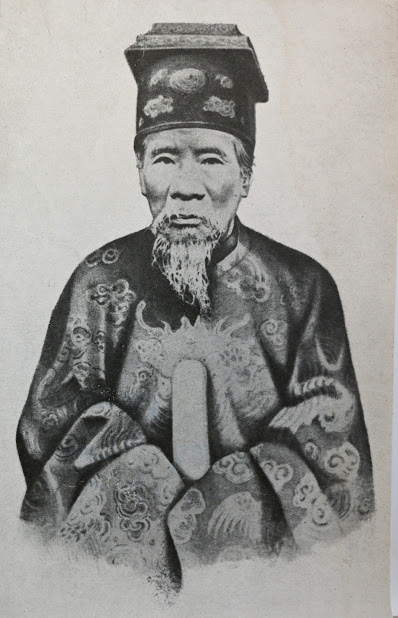
- Born: 3 February 1820
- Died: 18 November 1897 (aged 77)
Posthumous name
- Đoan Cung (端恭)
- Father: Emperor Minh Mạng
- Mother: Lê Thị Ái

Nguyễn Phúc Miên Trinh (chữ Hán: 阮福綿寊, 3 February 1820 – 18 November 1897), born Nguyễn Phúc Thư (阮福書), was a prince of Nguyễn dynasty, Vietnam.

== Life ==
Miên Trinh was the eleventh son of Minh Mạng, and his mother was Lê Thị Ái. He was intelligent and liked studying, so Minh Mạng was very fond of him.

He was appointed Right Director of Imperial Clan Court (Tôn Nhân Phủ Hữu Tôn Chính 尊人府右尊正) in 1882. After Tự Đức's death, he was granted the title Tuy Lý Vương (綏理王 "Prince of Tuy Lý") and named as regent together with Nguyễn Phúc Miên Định (Prince of Thọ Xuân) to assist the new emperor. He lost power in the political struggle against Nguyễn Văn Tường and Tôn Thất Thuyết, and sought refuge in French barracks, but was taken back to Huế by the French. Tường and Thuyết threw him into prison and later exiled him to Quảng Ngãi Province.

In 1885, Tôn Thất Thuyết launched a failed uprising against the French colonists, and escaped from Huế together with Emperor Hàm Nghi. During the emperor's absence, Miên Định was appointed as puppet "Prince Regent" (giám quốc) by French general Henri Roussel de Courcy. Miên Trinh and Miên Triện (Prince of Hoằng Hóa) were allowed to come back to Huế. In 1889, Emperor Thành Thái ascended the throne, and Miên Trinh was again appointed as regent. He died in 1897, and received the posthumous name Đoan Cung (端恭).

Miên Trinh fathered 77 sons and 37 daughters. His 18th son was poet Hồng Thiết, whose son Ưng Bình was also a poet. Miên Trinh also had two famous great-grandsons: Bửu Lộc, a politician; Bửu Hội, a diplomat and scientist.

== As a poet ==
Miên Trinh was good at writing Chinese poetry. Emperor Tự Đức, set a high value on his poetry: "Former Han proses are not worth comparing with those written by Siêu and Quát; (the quality of) High Tang poetry are surpassed by those written by Tùng and Tuy" (Classical Chinese: 文如超适無前漢 詩到從綏失盛唐; Vietnamese: Văn như Siêu, Quát vô tiền Hán; Thi đáo Tùng, Tuy thất thịnh Đường).

He and Nguyễn Phúc Miên Thẩm (Prince of Tùng Thiện), Nguyễn Phúc Miên Bửu (Prince of Tương An), were known as "Tam Đường" (三堂) of Nguyễn dynasty. Miên Trinh was a member of Mạc Vân thi xã ("Mạc Vân Poetry Society"). Nguyễn Phúc Miên Định (Prince of Thọ Xuân), Nguyễn Phúc Miên Thủ (Prince of Hàm Thuận), Nguyễn Phúc Miên Thẩm (Prince of Tùng Thiện), Nguyễn Phúc Miên Bửu (Prince of Tương An), Nguyễn Phúc Miên Triện (Prince of Hoằng Hóa), Nguyễn Văn Siêu, Cao Bá Quát, Hà Tôn Quyền, Phan Thanh Giản and Nguyễn Đăng Giai were also members of this poetry society.
