= Nguyễn Phúc Hồng Bảo =

Prince of Vietnam (b. 1825, d. 1854)

- An Phong Công (Duke of An Phong); An Phong Quận Vương (Prince An Phong of the 2nd Rank)
- Born: 19 April 1825
- Died: January 1854
Posthumous name
- Đoan Trang (端莊)
- House: Nguyễn Phúc
- Father: Emperor Thiệu Trị
- Mother: Đinh Thị Hạnh

Nguyễn Phúc Hồng Bảo (chữ Hán: 阮福洪保, 19 April 1825 – January 1854) was a prince of the Nguyễn dynasty, Vietnam.

== Early life ==
He was the eldest son of the Emperor Thiệu Trị, and Đinh Thị Hạnh. In 1843 he was granted the title An Phong Công (安豐公, "Duke of An Phong"). Prince Nguyễn Phúc Miên Bửu was appointed as the teacher of Hồng Bảo and his younger brother Hồng Nhậm (later Emperor Tự Đức).

According to Việt Nam sử lược, historian Trần Trọng Kim described Hồng Bảo as "an ignorant man and disliked studying". Thiệu Trị did not like him.

== Conflict with Tự Đức ==
Thiệu Trị died in 1847, and Hồng Nhậm became the new emperor. Four high ministers, Trương Đăng Quế, Võ Văn Giải, Nguyễn Tri Phương and Lâm Duy Hiệp, were appointed as regents. Why Thiệu Trị changed the primogeniture rule of succession is unknown; Western missionaries claimed that Trương Đăng Quế conducted a plot to depose Hồng Bảo, and crowned Hồng Nhậm as the new emperor. Rumors held that Hồng Nhậm was the illegitimate child of Trương Đăng Quế.

Hồng Bảo was deeply resentful; he always regarded himself as the heir presumptive of the former emperor, and hoped to seize the throne. Hồng Bảo tried to seek support from Roman Catholic missionaries; he promised that if he ascended the throne, he would convert to Catholicism, and make Vietnam a Catholic country.

In 1851, Hồng Bảo tried to escape to Singapore, but was arrested. He asked for forgiveness, and was pardoned by Tự Đức. In 1854, he plotted a rebellion against Tự Đức. He was arrested and forced to commit suicide by hanging. He was buried simply without a funeral.

== Legacy ==
Hồng Bảo's four sons, Nguyễn Phúc Ưng Đạo (阮福膺導), Nguyễn Phúc Ưng Tự (阮福膺寺), Nguyễn Phúc Ưng Chuyên (阮福膺傳) and Nguyễn Phúc Ưng Tương (阮福膺將), were banished from the royal court, and renamed Đinh Đạo (丁導), Đinh Tự (丁寺), Đinh Chuyên (丁傳) and Đinh Tương (丁將) respectively, then exiled to Khánh Hòa.

In 1866, Đinh Đạo launched a rebellion against Tự Đức together with Đoàn Hữu Trưng (段有徵), Đoàn Hữu Ái (段有愛), Đoàn Tư Trực (段司直), Trương Trọng Hòa (張仲和) and Phạm Lương (范梁). The rebellion was quickly put down. As a result, Hồng Bảo's four sons were put to death together with their mother Trần Thị Thụy (陳氏瑞).

In 1898, Hồng Bảo was rehabilitated by Thành Thái posthumously.
