= Cao Bá Quát =

Vietnamese poet and revolutionary

- Born: 1808; Gia Lâm, Hanoi, Vietnam
- Died: 1855 (aged 46–47)
- Cause of death: Killed in action or executed (disputed)
- Occupations: Civil Servant, Poet, Rebellion leader
- Era: Nguyễn Dynasty
- Known for: Mỹ Lương uprising against Emperor Tự Đức (1854-1856)
- Relatives: Cao Bá Nhạ (nephew)
- Writing career
- Pen name: Chu Thần (周臣); Mẫn Hiên (敏軒); Cúc Đường (菊堂)
- Language: Literary Chinese, Nôm (Sino-Vietnamese)
- Genres: Đường luật (Vietnamese adaptation of Tang poetry), Phú, Satire, Legend, Personal essay

Cao Bá Quát (高伯适, 1809–1855) was a Vietnamese poet and revolutionary who led a peasant uprising against Emperor Tự Đức. He was either executed or killed in battle. Many of his poems were destroyed, but about 1400 (most written in Literary Chinese) survive. His poems treat Buddhism sceptically.

== Early life and education ==
Cao Bá Quát was born in the year 1809 in Phu Thi Village, now part Gia Lâm district, Hanoi. He was alive during the during the reigns of the Nguyễn Dynasty emperors Minh Mang, Thieu Tri, and Tu Duc. At a young age, Cao Ba Quat exhibited intelligence that exceeded his age group; by the age of five, he was reportedly able to read the Three Character Classic. Cao Tuu Chieu, his father, was a Confucian and teacher.

It had been part of the Cao family tradition to enrol in the examinations to gain a position in the royal court. In 1831, Cao Ba Quat entered the local level public examination (Thi Hương), which was held in Hanoi. He was initially ranked second among all candidates, but eventually moved to the bottom rank of the 20 successful candidates following a review by the court, allegedly due to violations of exam regulations. In 1832, Cao Ba Quat took sat more advanced examination taking place in the country's capital (Hue at the time), Thi Hội, which he failed for several times.

== Service at the Imperial court ==
=== 1841 - 1844: Ministry of Rites and imprisonment ===
It took him until 1841 to gain a position in the royal court in Hue. By the recommendation of Bac Ninh Province's governor, Cao Bao Quat was appointed as a low-rank civil servant in the Ministry of Rites and became the primary examiner in the Thừa Thiên Examination Compound. At this job, while marking exam paper, Cao Bao Quat reportedly helped candidates in whose writing he saw potential by adjusting their content that was unwittingly in violation of the exam regulations. By 1842, his deception was eventually exposed, leading to Cao Bao Quat losing his post. For his crime, Cao Ba Quat was initially sentenced to death, which then got reduced to imprisonment, including a period of exile in Da Nang. In 1843, he was given the opportunity to go on a diplomatic mission to Indonesia as a way to earn his pardon. The mission returned in 1844, with Cao Ba Quat successfully earning his pardon, and being given his job back. However, he was dismissed from the role shortly thereafter. Cao Ba Quat moved back to his hometown of Hanoi as a result.

=== 1847 - 1850: Imperial Academy of Hue ===
In 1847, Cao Ba Quat was invited to work for the Imperial Academy of Hue Court. In this role, he was tasked with collecting and cataloguing literary works. During this time, Cao Ba Quat became acquainted with influential figures in the poetry scene in Hue, and was invited to join a poetry society founded by two royal princes, Nguyễn Phúc Miên Thẩm and Nguyễn Phúc Miên Trinh.

It was said that Cao Ba Quat did not have good relationships with senior officials of the royal court. Reportedly, this led to his redeployment to Quoc Oai (now part of Hanoi) to work as a Prefecture Education Commissioner in 1950.

== Mỹ Lương Uprising ==
By 1854, during the reign of emperor Tu Duc, the country saw rising poverty and famine due to draughts and locust swarm. According to some historians, Cao Ba Quat mobilised influential officials, scholars, and community leaders to organise a rebellion. It was said that Cao Ba Quat used to believe that working for the imperial court was a way he could contribute to improving the lives of the poorest and most vulnerable people in society. However, this belief was dispelled during his service at the imperial court, leading him to support the idea of a civil uprising.

The plan for the uprising was ultimately foiled due to a betrayal. However, attacks from the rebels did go ahead, with Cao Ba Quat personally taking part in a battle in Yên Sơn in 1855. This eventually led to his demise, though sources have differed in the cause of his death, which has continued to be hotly debated to this day. Some have said that Cao Ba Quat was shot dead during battle. Others have said that the imperial army defeated the rebellion, and Cao Ba Quat, along with other rebels, was executed. Emperor Tự Đức reportedly ordered to execute all generations of his family as punishment for Cao Ba Quat's involvement in the uprising.

Despite the rebellion being unsuccessful, Cao Ba Quat was reportedly remembered and respected for his indominable attitude.

== Poetry ==
Cao Bá Quát was well known for his eccentric personality; he chose to continue to live a poor lifestyle and wore battered clothing. Through his literary work, Cao Ba Quat expressed his discontent with the loss of human dignity caused by society's desire for fame and fortune. Emperor Tự Đức was a knowledgeable literary scholar himself and had recognised Cao Bao Quat for his literary talents. There have been folk legends of Cao Ba Quat's encounters with Emperor Tự Đức where the poet impressed the emperor with his poetry and his wit. According to these legends, as disgraceful and arrogant as Tu Duc saw Cao Ba Quat, the emperor could not hide his admiration for him.

Cao Bá Quát expressed his condemnation of Emperor Tự Đức and his court through his poems, circulated among common people in the country.

Due to Cao Ba Quat's involvement in the My Luong uprising, many of his literary works were prohibited from circulation and destroyed from records by the imperial court's order. However, a team of researchers in the 1980s managed to uncover and archive a formidable number of pieces authored by Cao Ba Quat. In particular, these researchers found:

- 1353 poems
- 11 personal essays
- 10 short stories in the style of folklores.

The majority of his work recovered were written in Chinese, with much fewer written in Chữ Nôm.
