= Minh Mạng =

Second emperor of the Vietnamese Nguyễn dynasty in the 19th century

Emperor Minh Mạng 明命帝
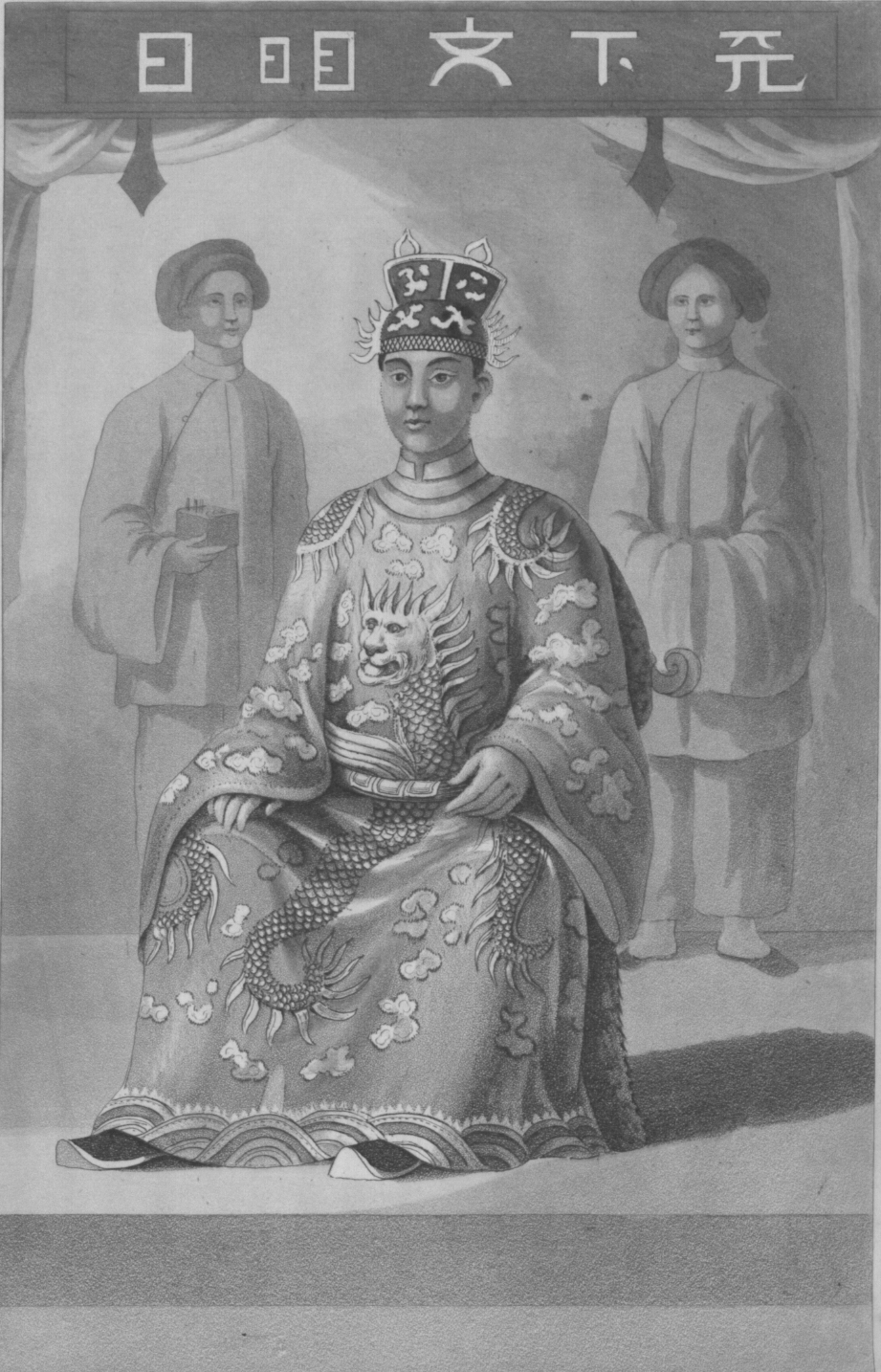
- Portrait of Minh Mạng by John Crawfurd, 1822

Emperor of Việt Nam
- Reign: 14 February 1820 – 15 February 1839
- Predecessor: Gia Long
- Successor: Việt Nam renamed to Đại Nam

Emperor of Đại Nam
- Reign: 15 February 1839 – 20 January 1841
- Predecessor: Việt Nam renamed to Đại Nam
- Successor: Thiệu Trị

Emperor of the Nguyễn dynasty
- Reign: 14 February 1820 – 20 January 1841
- Predecessor: Gia Long
- Successor: Thiệu Trị
- Born: Nguyễn Phúc Đảm; 25 May 1791; Gia Định, Việt Nam
- Died: 20 January 1841 (aged 49); Quang Minh hall (光明殿), Imperial City, Huế
- Burial: 20 August 1841 - Hiếu Lăng, Imperial City, Huế
Names
- Nguyễn Phúc Đảm (阮福膽); Nguyễn Phúc Kiểu (阮福晈)
Era name and dates
- Minh Mạng (明命): 1820–1841
Posthumous name
- Thể thiên Xương vận Chí hiếu Thuần đức Văn vũ Minh đoán Sáng thuật Đại thành Hậu trạch Phong công Nhân Hoàng đế (體天昌運至孝純德文武明斷創述大成厚澤豐功仁皇帝)
Temple name
- Thánh Tổ (聖祖)
- House: Nguyễn Phúc
- Father: Gia Long
- Mother: Empress Thuận Thiên
- Religion: Confucianism

Minh Mạng (Hanoi: [mïŋ˧ maːŋ˧˨ʔ]), also known as Minh Mệnh (Hanoi: [mïŋ˧ məjŋ̟˧˨ʔ], chữ Hán: 明 命, lit. 'the bright favour of Heaven'; 25 May 1791 – 20 January 1841; born Nguyễn Phúc Đảm (阮福膽), also known as Nguyễn Phúc Kiểu), was the second emperor of the Nguyễn dynasty of Vietnam, reigning from 14 February 1820 until his death, on 20 January 1841. He was the fourth son of Emperor Gia Long, whose eldest son, Nguyễn Phúc Cảnh, had died in 1801. He was well known for his opposition to French involvement in Vietnam, completing the final Vietnamese conquest of Champa, temporary annexation of Cambodia, and his rigid Confucian orthodoxy.

== Early years ==
Born Nguyễn Phúc Đảm at Gia Định in the middle of the Second Tây Sơn – Nguyễn War, Minh Mạng was the fourth son of lord Nguyễn Phúc Ánh – future Emperor Gia Long. His mother was Gia Long's second wife Trần Thị Đang, later known as the empress Thuận Thiên. At the age of three, under the effect of a written agreement made by Gia Long with his first wife the Empress Thừa Thiên, she took Đảm in and raised him as her own son. Following Thừa Thiên's death in 1814, it was supposed that her grandson, Crown Prince Cảnh's eldest son Mỹ Đường, would be responsible for conducting the funeral. Gia Long however, brought out the agreement to insist that Phúc Đảm, as Thừa Thiên's son, should be the one fulfilling the duty. Despite opposition from mandarins, such as Nguyễn Văn Thành, Gia Long was decisive with his selection.

In 1816, Gia Long appointed Đảm as his heir apparent. After the ceremony, Crown Prince Đảm moved to Thanh Hòa Palace and started assisting his father in processing documents and discussing country issues.

Gia Long's death coincided with the re-establishment of the Paris Missionary Society's operations in Vietnam, which had closed in 1792 during the chaos of the power struggle between Gia Long and the Tây Sơn brothers before Vietnam was unified. In the early years of Minh Mạng's government, the most serious challenge came from one of his father's most trusted lieutenants and a national hero in Vietnam, Lê Văn Duyệt, who had led the Nguyễn forces to victory at Qui Nhơn in 1801 against the Tây Sơn dynasty and was made regent in the south by Gia Long with full freedom to rule and deal with foreign powers.

== Policy towards missionaries and Christianity ==
In February 1825, Minh Mạng banned Christian missionaries from entering Vietnam. French vessels entering Vietnamese harbours were ordered to be searched with extra care. All entries were to be watched "lest some masters of the European religion enter furtively, mix with the people and spread darkness in the kingdom." In an imperial edict, Christianity was described as the "perverse European" (practice) and accused of "corrupting the hearts of men".

Between 1833 and 1838, seven missionaries were sentenced to death, amongst them Pierre Borie, Joseph Marchand, and Jean-Charles Cornay. He first attempted to stifle the spread of Christianity by attempting to isolate Catholic priests and missionaries from the populace. He asserted that he had no French interpreters after Chaigneau's departure and summoned the French clergy to Hue and appointed them as mandarins of high rank to woo them from their proselytising. This worked until a priest, Father Regereau, entered the country and began missionary work. Following the edict which forbade further entry of missionaries into Vietnam, arrests of clerics began. After strong lobbying by Duyệt, the governor of Cochin China, and a close confidant of Gia Long and Pigneau de Behaine, Minh Mạng agreed to release the priests on the condition that they congregate at Đà Nẵng and return to France. Some of them obeyed the orders, but others disobeyed the order upon being released, and returned to their parishes and resumed preaching.

Martyrdom of Joseph Marchand in 1835

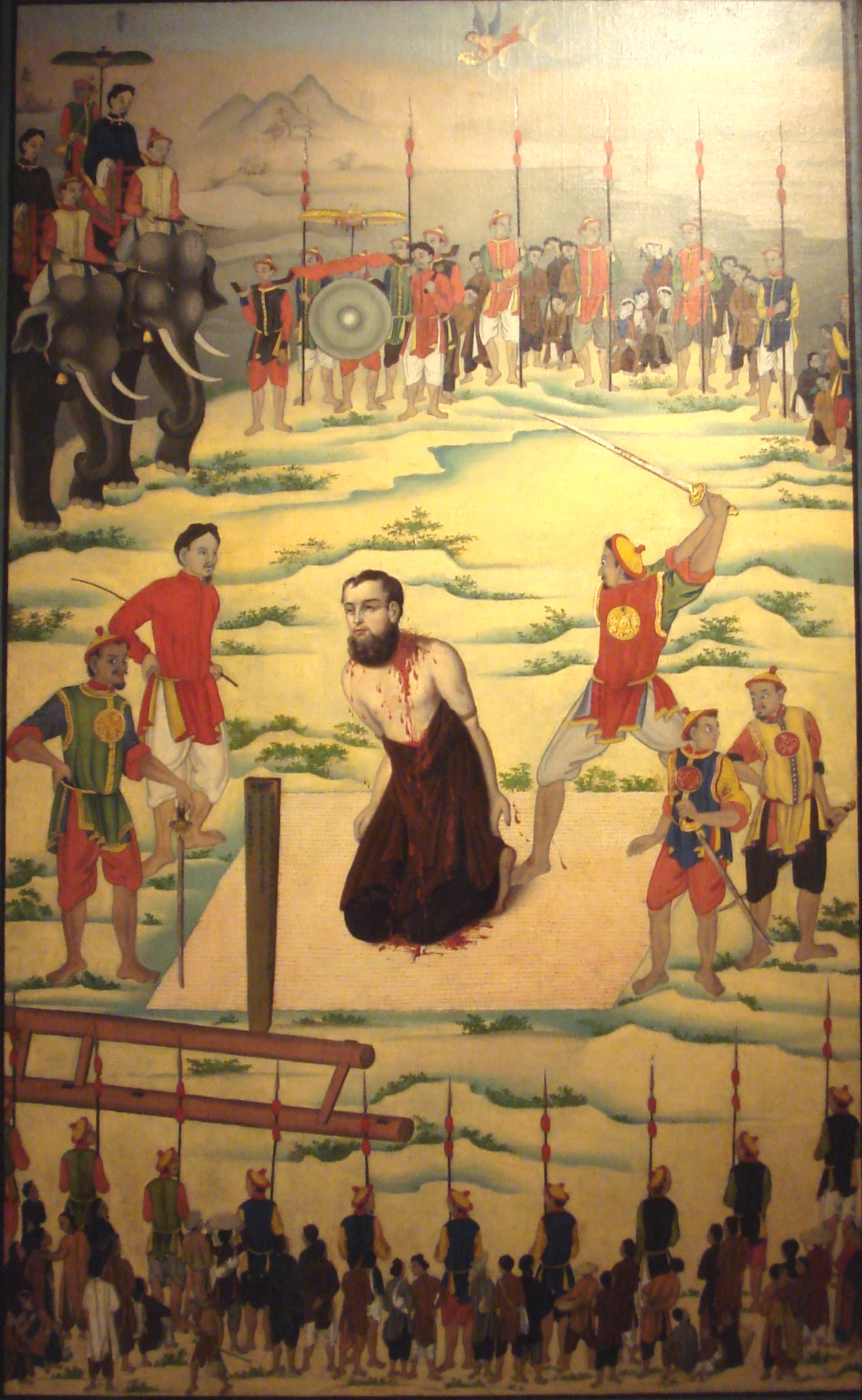
Martyrdom of Pierre Borie on 24 November 1838

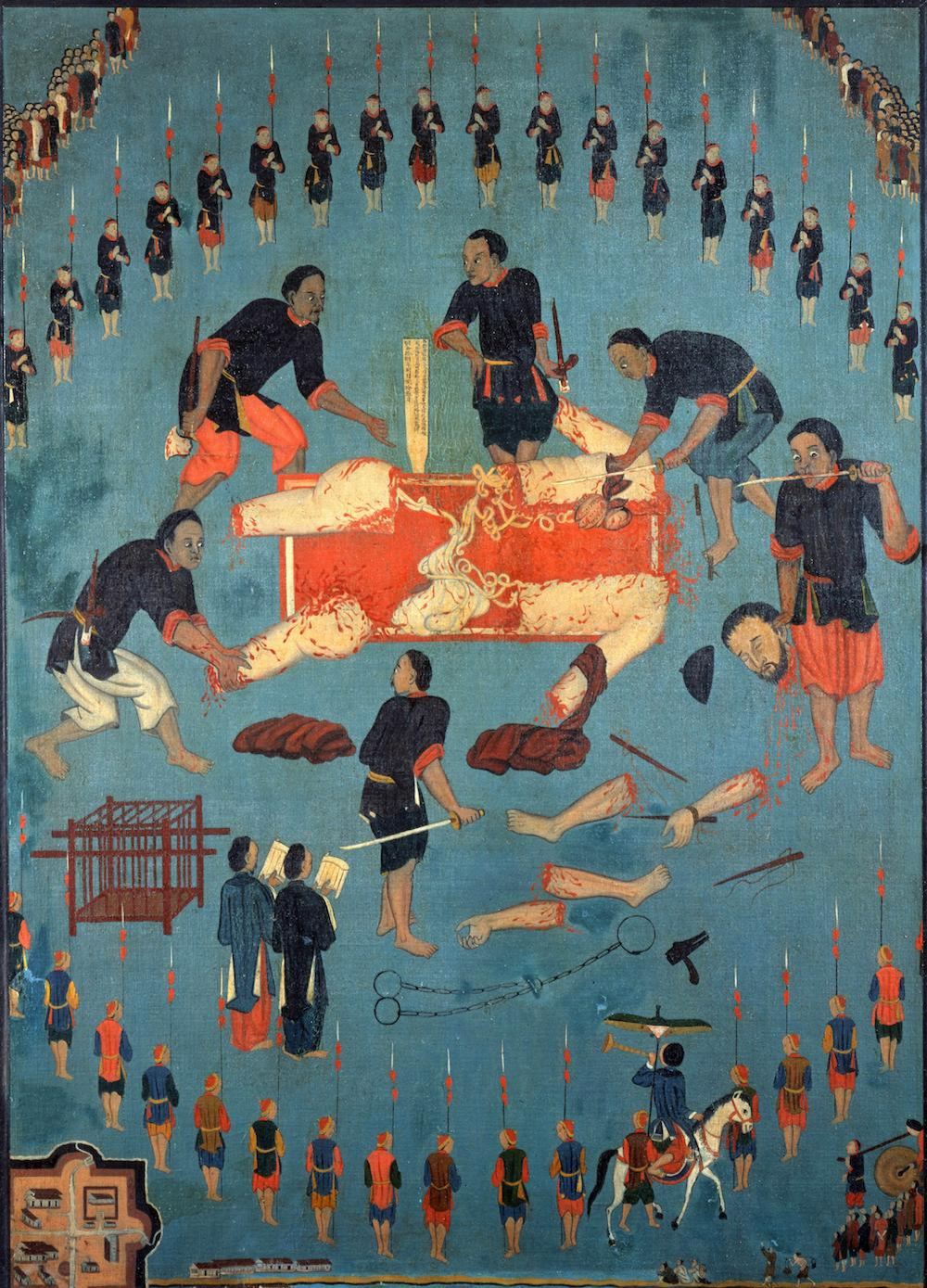
Martyrdom of Jean-Charles Cornay, 1837

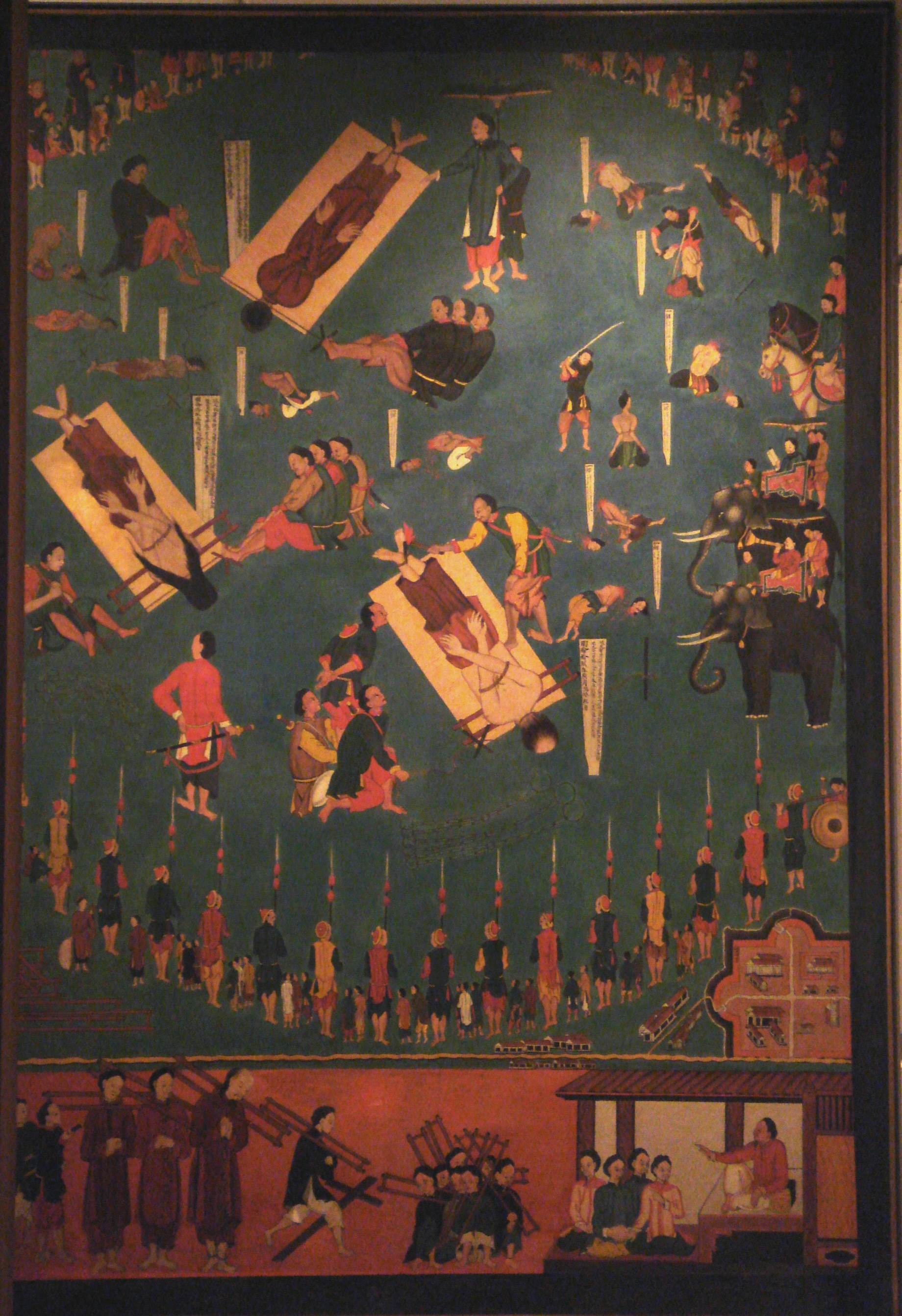
Martyrdom of Paul Mi, Pierre Duong and Pierre Truat on 18 December 1838

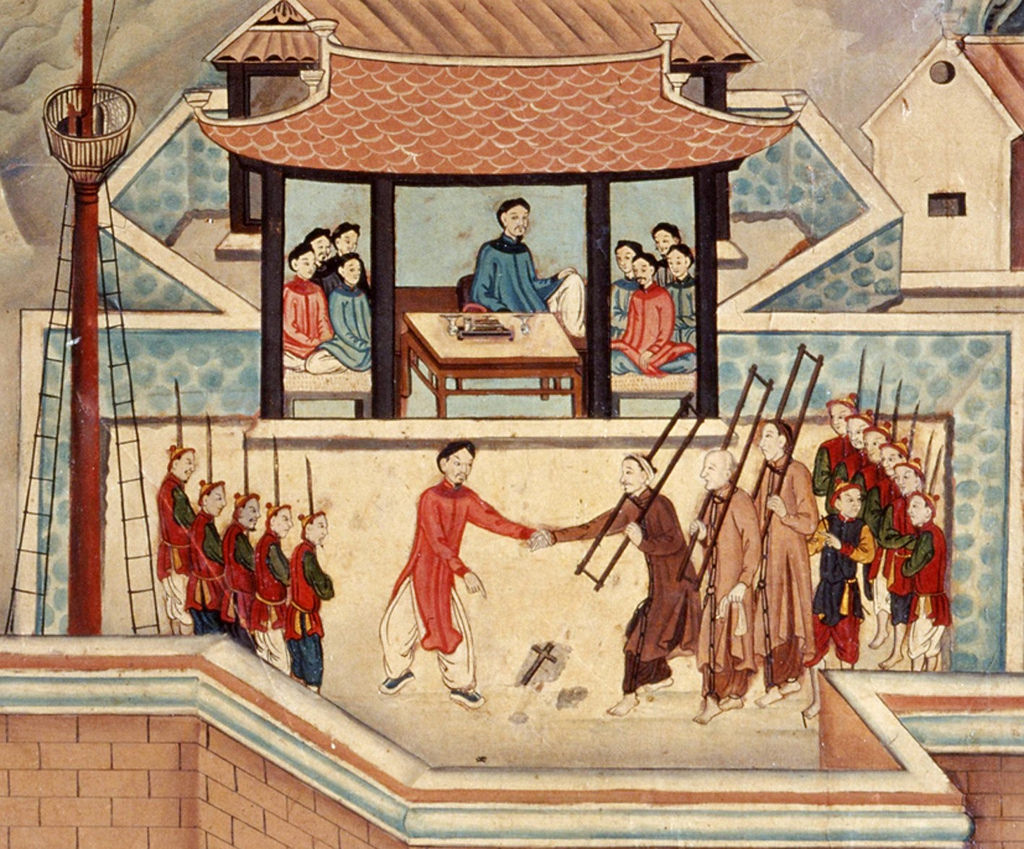
Painting depicts the trial of three Catholics in Ninh Bình in 1838, where they were forced to step on the cross

== Isolationist foreign policy ==
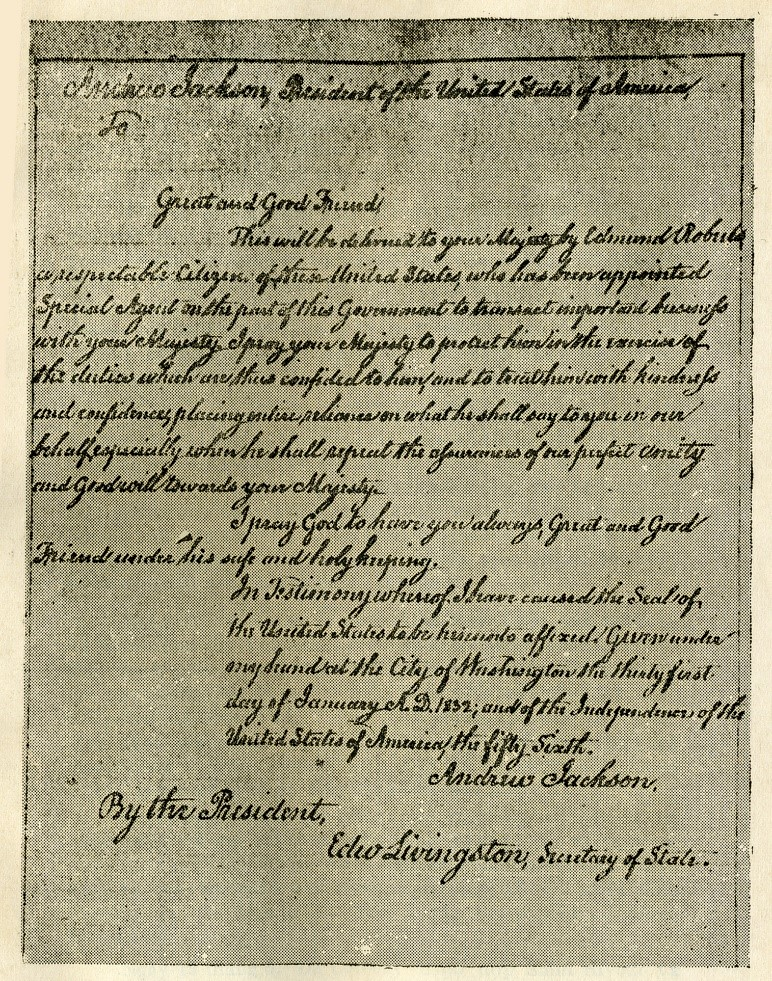
Letter of the US president Andrew Jackson to emperor Minh Mạng for requesting of diplomatic relationship establishment in 1832

Minh Mạng continued and intensified his father's isolationist and conservative Confucian policies. At the start of his rule, Vietnam was of no interest to the European powers, since most of the continent was engaged in the Napoleonic Wars. Nevertheless, Napoleon had seen it as a strategically important objective in the Anglo-French power struggle in Asia, as he felt that it would make an ideal base from which to contest the East India Company's foothold in the Indian subcontinent. With the restoration of the Bourbon monarchy and the final exile of Napoleon in 1815, the military scene in Europe quieted and French interest in Vietnam was revived. Jean-Baptiste Chaigneau, one of the volunteers of Pigneau de Behaine who had helped Gia Long in his quest for power, had become a mandarin and continued to serve Minh Mạng, upon whose ascension, Chaigneau and his colleagues were treated more distantly. He eventually left in November 1824. In 1825, he was appointed as French consul to Vietnam after returning to his homeland to visit his family after more than a quarter of a century in Asia. Upon his return, Minh Mạng received him coldly. The policy of isolationism soon saw Vietnam fall further behind the pace of technology and become more vulnerable to outside encroachment as political stability returned to continental Europe, allowing European powers free hand to once again direct their attention towards increasing their influence in Asia. With his Confucian orthodoxy, Minh Mạng shunned all Western influence and ideas as hostile and avoided all contact.

In 1819, Lieutenant John White of the United States Navy was the first American to make contact with Vietnam, arriving in Saigon. Minh Mạng was willing to sign a contract, but only to purchase artillery, firearms, uniforms and books. White was of the opinion that the deal was not sufficiently advantageous and nothing was implemented. In 1821, a trade agreement from Louis XVIII was turned away, with Minh Mạng indicating that no special deal would be offered to any country. That same year, East India Company agent John Crawfurd made another attempt at contact, but was allowed to disembark only in the northern ports of Tonkin; he gained no agreements, but concluded relations with France posed no threat to Company trade. In 1822, the French frigate La Cleopatre visited Tourane (present day Đà Nẵng). Her captain was to pay his respects to Minh Mạng, but was greeted with a symbolic dispatch of troops as though an invasion had been expected. In 1824 Minh Mạng rejected the offer of an alliance from Burma against Siam, a common enemy of both countries. In 1824 Henri Baron de Bougainville was sent by Louis XVIII to Vietnam with the stated mission "of peace and protection of commerce. Upon arriving in Tourane in 1825, it was not allowed ashore. The royal message was turned away on the pretext that there was nobody able to translate it. It was assumed that the snub was related to an attempt by Bougainville to smuggle ashore a Catholic missionary from the Missions étrangères de Paris. Jean-Baptiste Chaigneau's nephew, Eugène Chaigneau, was sent to Vietnam in 1826 as the intended consul but was forced to leave the country without taking up his position.

Further fruitless attempts to start a commercial deal were led by de Kergariou in 1827 and Admiral Laplace in 1831. Another effort by Chaigneau in 1829 also failed. In 1831 another French envoy was turned away. Vietnam under Minh Mạng was the first East Asian country with whom the United States sought foreign relations. President Andrew Jackson tried twice to contact Minh Mạng, sending Edmund Roberts in 1832, and Consul Joseph Balestier in 1836, to no avail. In 1837 and 1838, La bonite and L'Artémise were ordered to land in Tourane to attempt to gauge the situation in Vietnam with respect to missionary work. Both were met with hostility and communication was prevented. Later, in 1833 and 1834, a war with Siam was fought over control of Cambodia which for the preceding century had been reduced to impotence and had fallen under the control of its two neighbours.

In 1824, a Burmese envoy dispatched by the Burmese king, presenting a proposal of a Burmese–Vietnamese alliance against Siam, which was immediately declined by Minh Mang. Minh Mang saw a risky war against Siam, the former ally, might have jeopardized Vietnamese hegemony in Cambodia, which had been acquired by his father Gia Long. Second, he had carefully watched the British seizure of Singapore in 1819 and who were waging war in Burma, thus he saw Britain as the new rising threat, and urged that the Chakri dynasty of Siam should focus alongside Burma in their struggle against the British expansion.

After Vietnam under Gia Long gained control over Cambodia in the early 19th century, a Vietnamese-approved monarch was installed. Minh Mạng was forced to put down a Siamese attempt to regain control of the vassal, as well as an invasion of southern Vietnam which coincided with rebellion by Lê Văn Khôi. The Siamese planned the invasion to coincide with the rebellion, putting enormous strain on the Nguyễn armies. Eventually, Minh Mạng's forces were able to repel the invasion, as well as the revolt in Saigon, and he reacted to Western encroachment by blaming Christianity and showing hostility, leading to the European powers' asserting that intervention was needed to protect their missionaries. This resulted in missed opportunities to avert the colonisation of Vietnam through having friendly relations, since strong opposition was raised in France against an invasion, due to the costs of such a venture. After the outbreak of the First Opium War in 1839, Minh Mạng attempted to build an alliance with European powers by sending a delegation of two lower rank mandarins and two interpreters in 1840. They were received in Paris by Prime Minister Marshal Soult and the Commerce Minister, but they were shunned by King Louis-Philippe. This came after the Society of Foreign Missions and the Holy See had urged a rebuke for an "enemy of the religion". The delegation went on to London, with no success.

== Domestic program ==
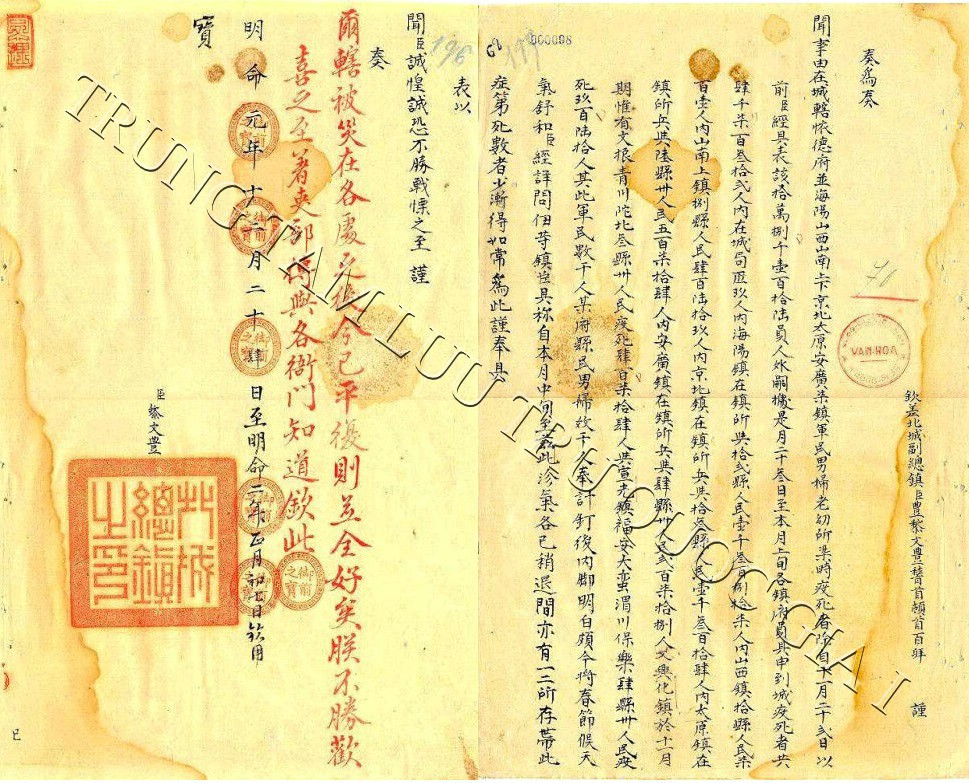
Letter sent from Viceroy of Northern Vietnam Lê Chất to emperor Minh Mạng reporting 114,282 people died from cholera in northern provinces in 1820

The beginning of Minh Mang rule over Vietnam was vastly unsettling. Vietnam was divided into autonomous domains governed independently by Viceroys under Gia Long. The first cholera pandemic reached Vietnam in summer 1820 removed 206,835 tax payers from royal tax registers, while political scientist Samuel Popkin suggested that around one million people might have been perished due to the disease, out of Vietnam's total population of around eight million.

On the domestic front, Minh Mạng continued his father's national policies of reorganising the administrative structure of the government. These included the construction of highways, a postal service, public storehouses for food, monetary and agrarian reforms. He continued to redistribute land periodically and forbade all other sales of land to prevent wealthy citizens from reacquiring excessive amounts of land with their money. In 1840 it was decreed that rich landowners had to return a third of their holdings to the community. Calls for basic industrialisation and diversification of the economy into fields such as mining and forestry were ignored. He further centralised the administration, introduced the definition of three levels of performance in the triennial examinations for recruiting mandarins. In 1839, Minh Mạng introduced a program of salaries and pensions for princes and mandarins to replace the traditional assignment of fief estates.

Diseases, disasters and rebellions against oppression and misery were very frequent, undermining the emperor's strength. Vietnam was at its low point of coherence in history. About 200 rebellions were recorded during his twenty-year reign.

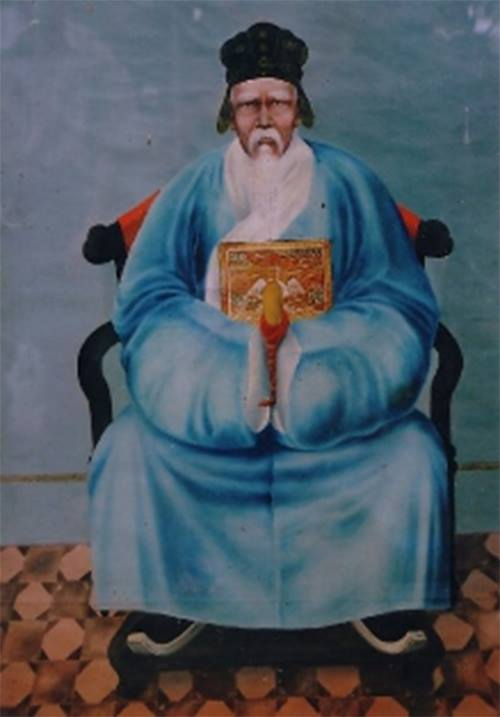
Thân Văn Nhiếp, Sinologist and Law prosecutor in the Ming Mạng's reign

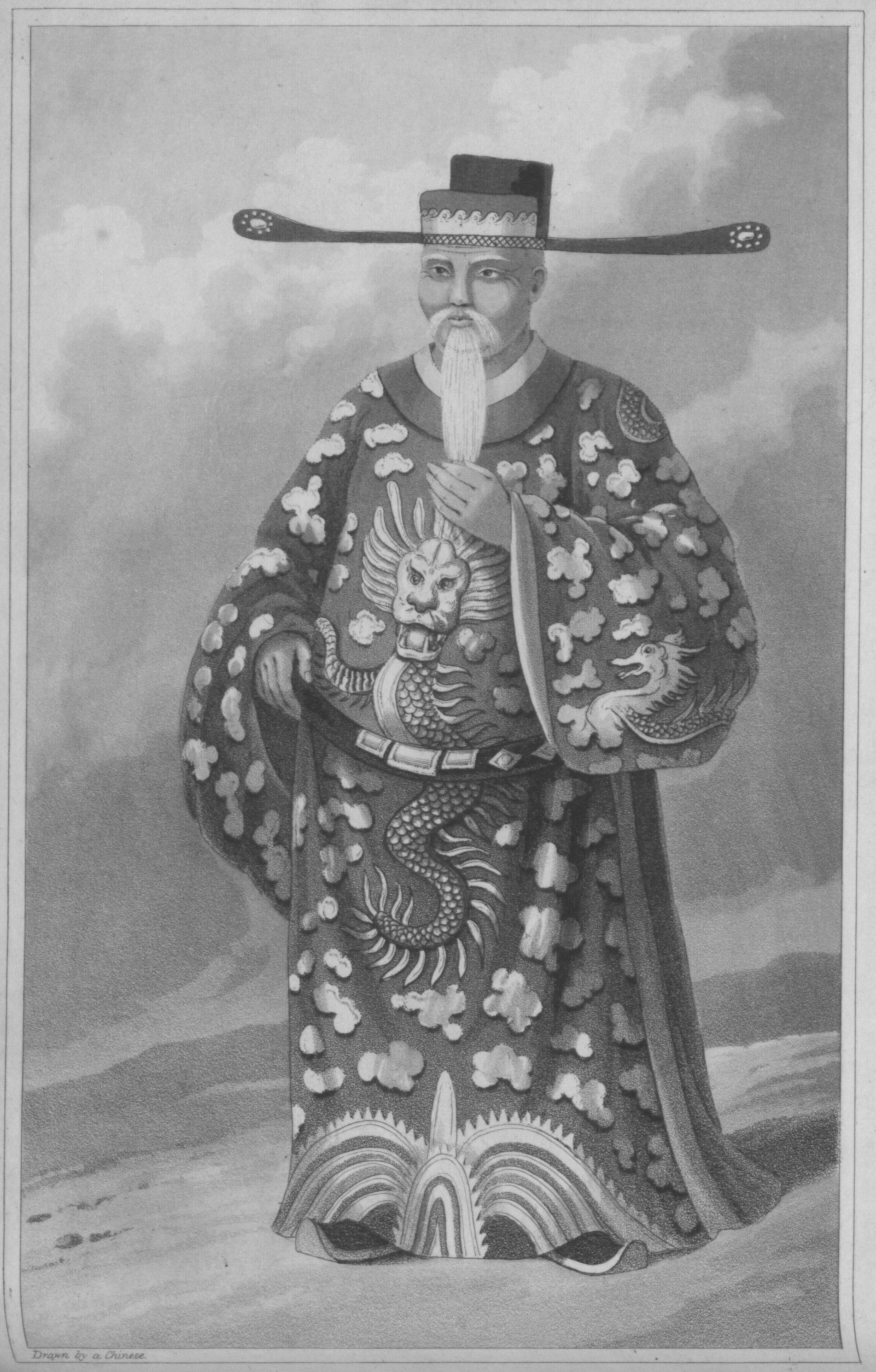
Trương Tấn Bửu the Viceroy of Hanoi in 1802 and vieroy of Gia Định in 1823 under Gia Long and Minh Mạng's reigns respectively

=== Conquests and ethnic minority policy ===
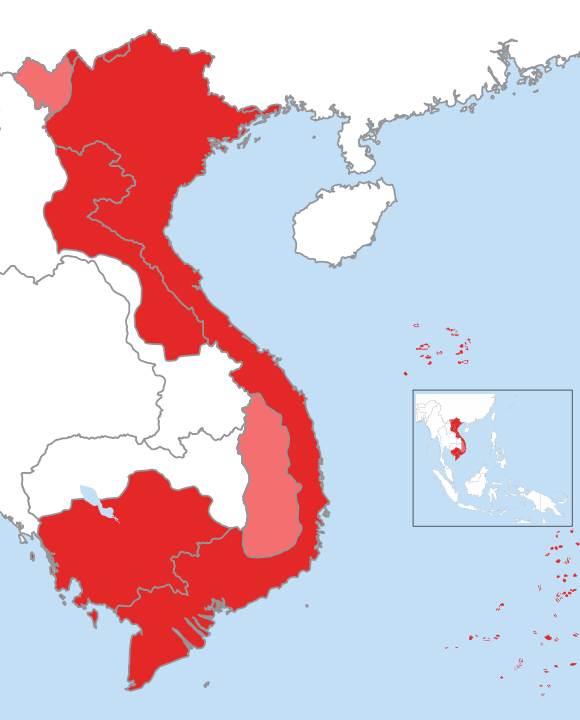
Map of the extent of the Vietnamese empire's power under Minh Mạng's rule

Despite ongoing intra-turmoil, Minh Mang exhibited his admiring to Confucian rule and classical Chinese culture, while imposing ethnic assimilation at home and pursuing territorial expansion and interference in neighboring Laos. Minh Mang put his support to Vientiane's king Chao Anou, his close ally, to wage war against Siam. But the outcome did not go for their plan. Anou was defeated and then was detaining to the Siamese in late 1828 by Chao Noi, ruler of Muang Phuan, also a tributary of Minh Mang. Chao Noi was arrested by the Vietnamese for betraying, then being executed in Hue by Minh Mang. Muang Phuan was annexed into Vietnam in 1832 as Tran Ninh prefecture.

Minh Mạng enacted the final conquest of the Champa Kingdom after the centuries long Cham–Vietnamese wars. He aggressively repressed culture of the Cham and indigenous highland peoples. The Cham Muslim leader Katip Sumat was educated in Kelantan and came back to Champa to declare a Jihad against the Vietnamese after Emperor Minh Mạng's annexation of Champa.

The Chinese or Hoa particularly concentrated in urbanized areas such as Saigon, Cho Lon, and Hanoi. They organized themselves into bang or 'congregations.' Two groups of Chinese that people tended to distinct, known as Minh Hương and Thanh nhân. The Minh hương were South Chinese refugees of the Ming dynasty that had migrated and settled down in South Vietnam earlier during the 17th century, who married with Cambodian women, had been substantially assimilated to local Vietnamese and Khmer populaces, and loyal to the Nguyen, compared to the Thanh nhân, Chinese immigrants of the Qing dynasty that recently arrived in Southern Vietnam, who dominated the grain trade. During the reign of Minh Mạng, a restriction against the Thanh nhân was issued in 1827, which prohibits the Thanh nhân access to the state bureaucracy, rice monopoly and foreign trade. Their alternate option was having themselves to be adjusted and integrated into Vietnamese society like the Minh Hương.

Minh Mang sent troops to crushed a rebellion in Cambodia in 1820, then incorporated Cambodia into Vietnam in 1834 as the new Tây Thành province. Since then, until his death, Minh Mang had been trying to force the Cambodians to adopt Vietnamese culture by the cultural assimilation progress of what historian David P. Chandler dubbed The Vietnamization of Cambodia. Siamese accounts describe that Khmer nobles in Phnom Penh was forced to dress like Vietnamese, abide to Vietnamese laws, and were called "the new Yuon (Viet)". Douglas Johnson recalled year 1836 as the momentum marked the greatest territorial extent of the Vietnamese empire, also high point of its stability which most revolts in Minh Mang's realm had been suppressed. However, continuous uprisings in Cambodia, Tonkin, and wars with Siam put Minh Mang's expansion to an query, as all sides became exhausted.

=== Rebellions ===
Minh Mạng was regarded as being in touch with the concerns of the populace. Frequent local rebellions reminded him of their plight. Descendants of the old Lê dynasty fomented dissent in the north, appealing not only to the peasantry but to the Catholic minority. They attempted to enlist foreign help by promising to open up to missionaries. Local leaders in the south were upset with the loss of the relative political autonomy they enjoyed under Duyệt. With Duyệt's death in 1832, a strong defender of Christianity passed. Catholics had traditionally been inclined to side with rebel movements against the monarchy more than most Vietnamese and this erupted after Duyệt's death. Minh Mạng ordered Duyệt posthumously indicted and one hundred lashes were applied to his grave. This caused indignation against southerners who respected Duyệt. In July 1833, a revolt broke out under the leadership of his adopted son, Lê Văn Khôi. Historical opinion is divided with scholars contesting whether the grave desecration or the loss of southern autonomy after Duyệt's death was the main catalyst. Khôi's rebels brought Cochinchina under their control and proposed to replace Minh Mạng with a son of Prince Cảnh. Khôi took into hostage French missionary Joseph Marchand within the citadel, thinking that his presence would win over Catholic support. Khôi enlisted Siamese support, which was forthcoming and helped put Minh Mạng on the defense for a period.

Eventually, however, the Siamese were defeated and the south was recaptured by royalist forces, who besieged Saigon. Khôi died during the siege in December 1834 and Saigon fell nine months later in September 1835 and the rebel commanders put to death. In all the estimates of the captured rebels was put between 500 and 2000, who were executed. The missionaries were rounded up and ordered out of the country. The first French missionary executed was Gagelin in October 1833, the second was Marchand, who was put to death along with the other leaders of the Saigon citadel which surrendered in September 1835. From then until 1838 five more missionaries were put to death. The missionaries began seeking protection from their home countries and the use of force against Asians.

Minh Mạng pursued a policy of cultural assimilation of non-Viet ethnic groups which from 1841, through 1845, led to southern Vietnam experiencing a series of ethnic revolts.

== Ruling style ==
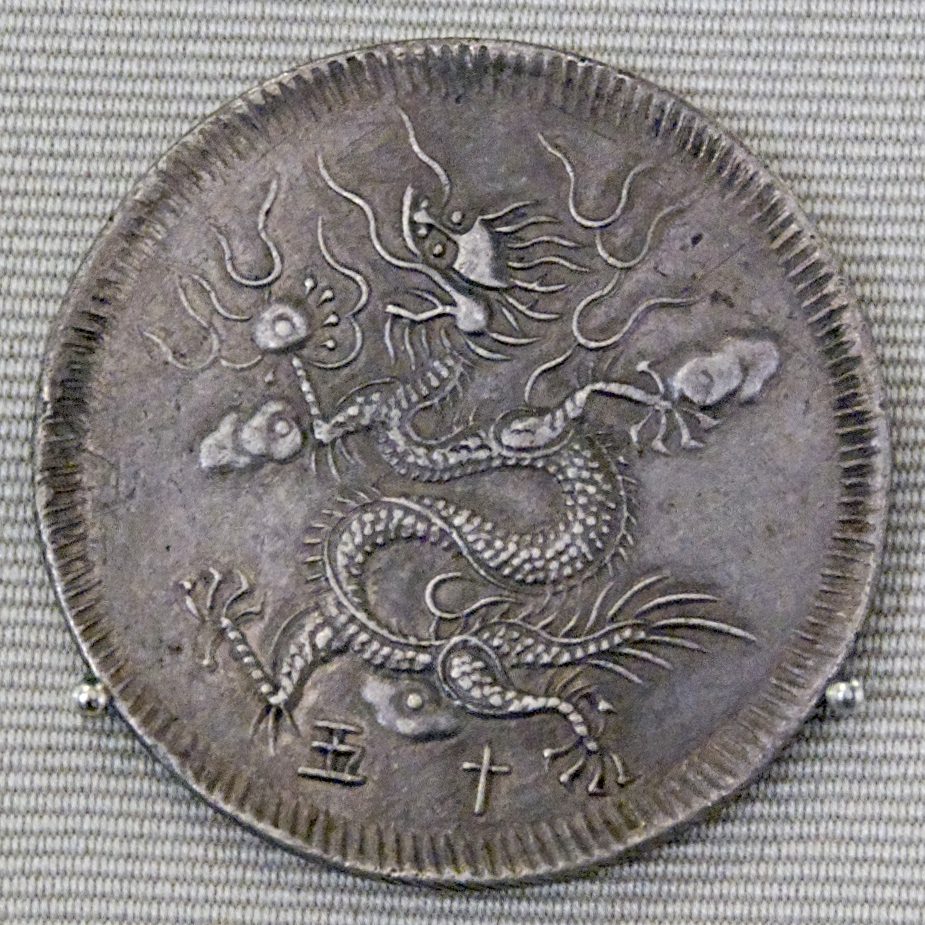
Coin bearing the flying dragon (phi long) issued by Minh Mạng, 1833

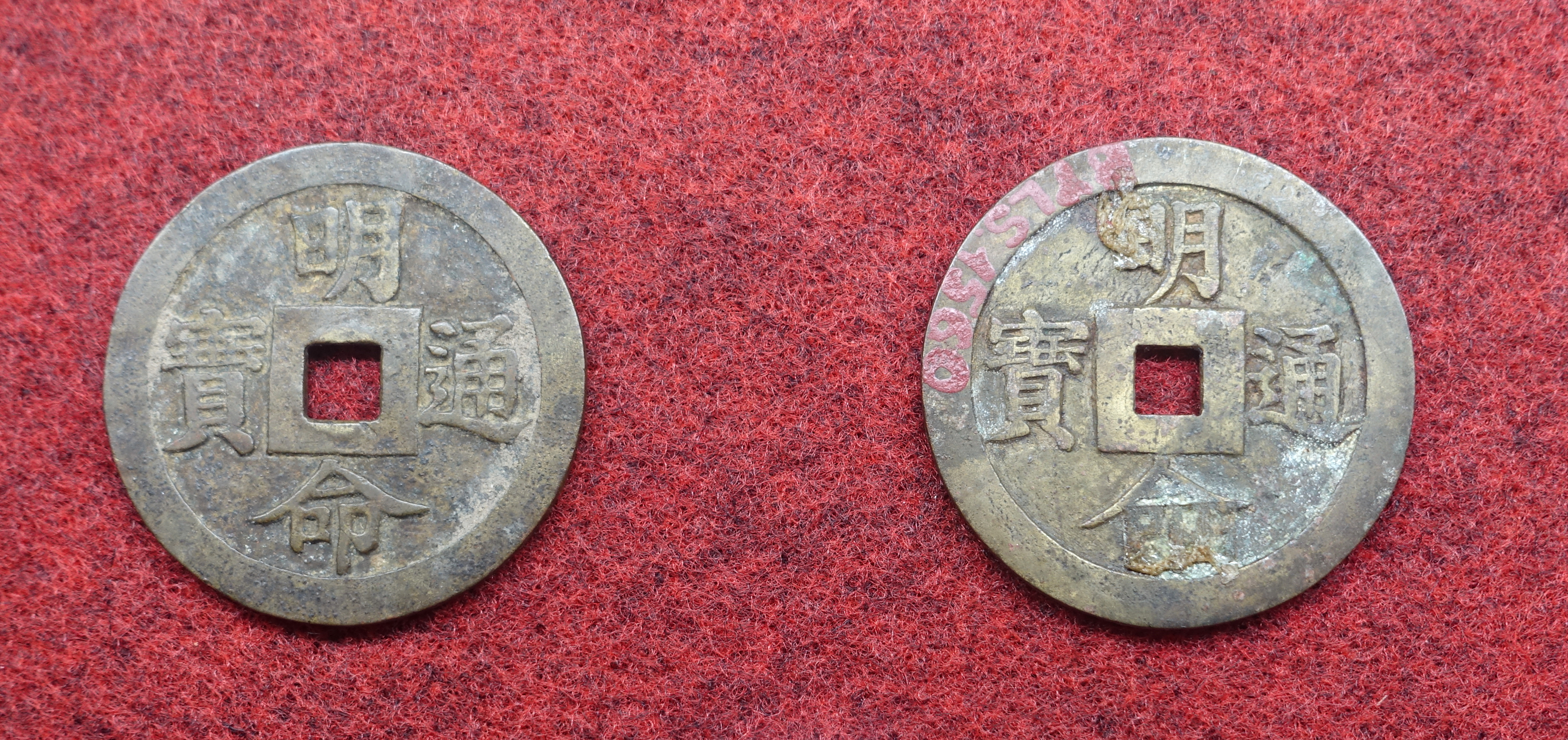
Minh Mạng thông bảo, 1820–1840 AD

Minh Mạng was known for his firmness of character, which guided his instincts in his policy making. This accentuated his unwillingness to break with orthodoxy in dealing with Vietnam's problems. His biographer, Marcel Gaultier, asserted that Minh Mạng had expressed his opinions about national policy before Gia Long's death, proposing a policy of greater isolationism and shunning Westerners, and that Long tacitly approved of this. Minh Mạng was regarded as more nuanced and gentle than his father, with less forced labour and an increased perceptiveness towards the sentiment of the peasantry.

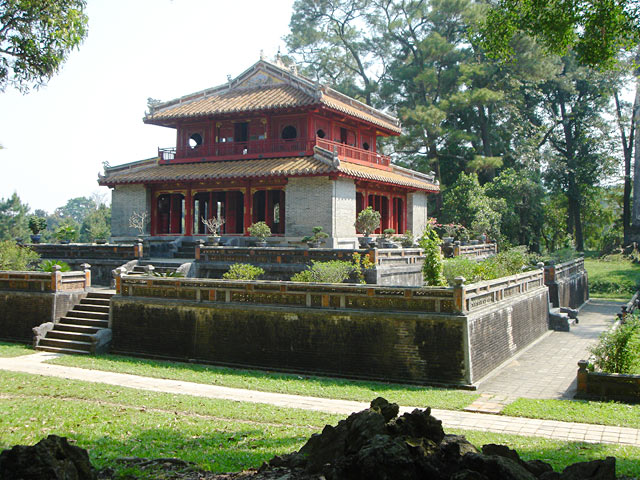
Minh Mạng mausoleum, Hue

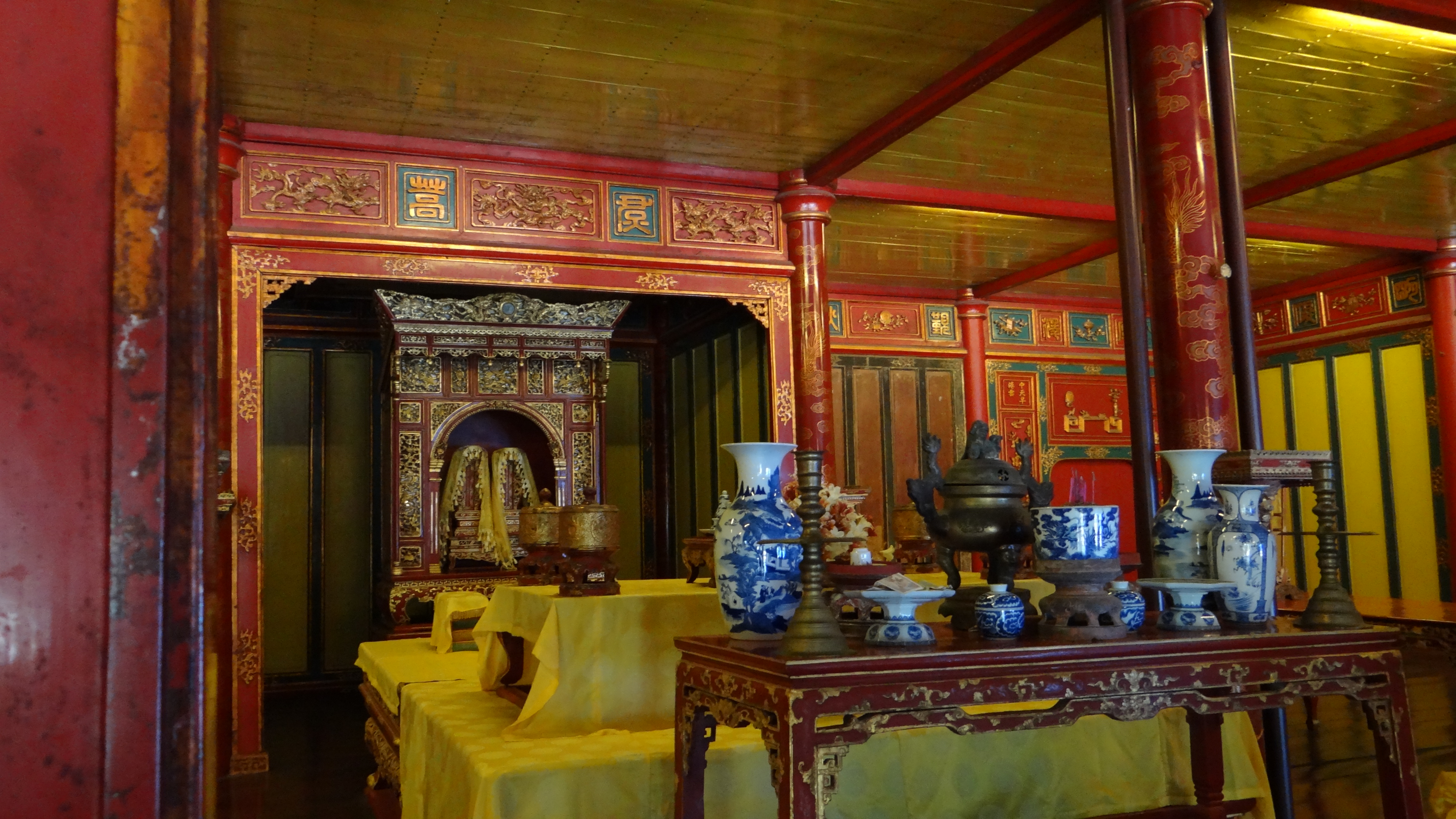
Altar and Spirit tablet of Minh Mạng inside

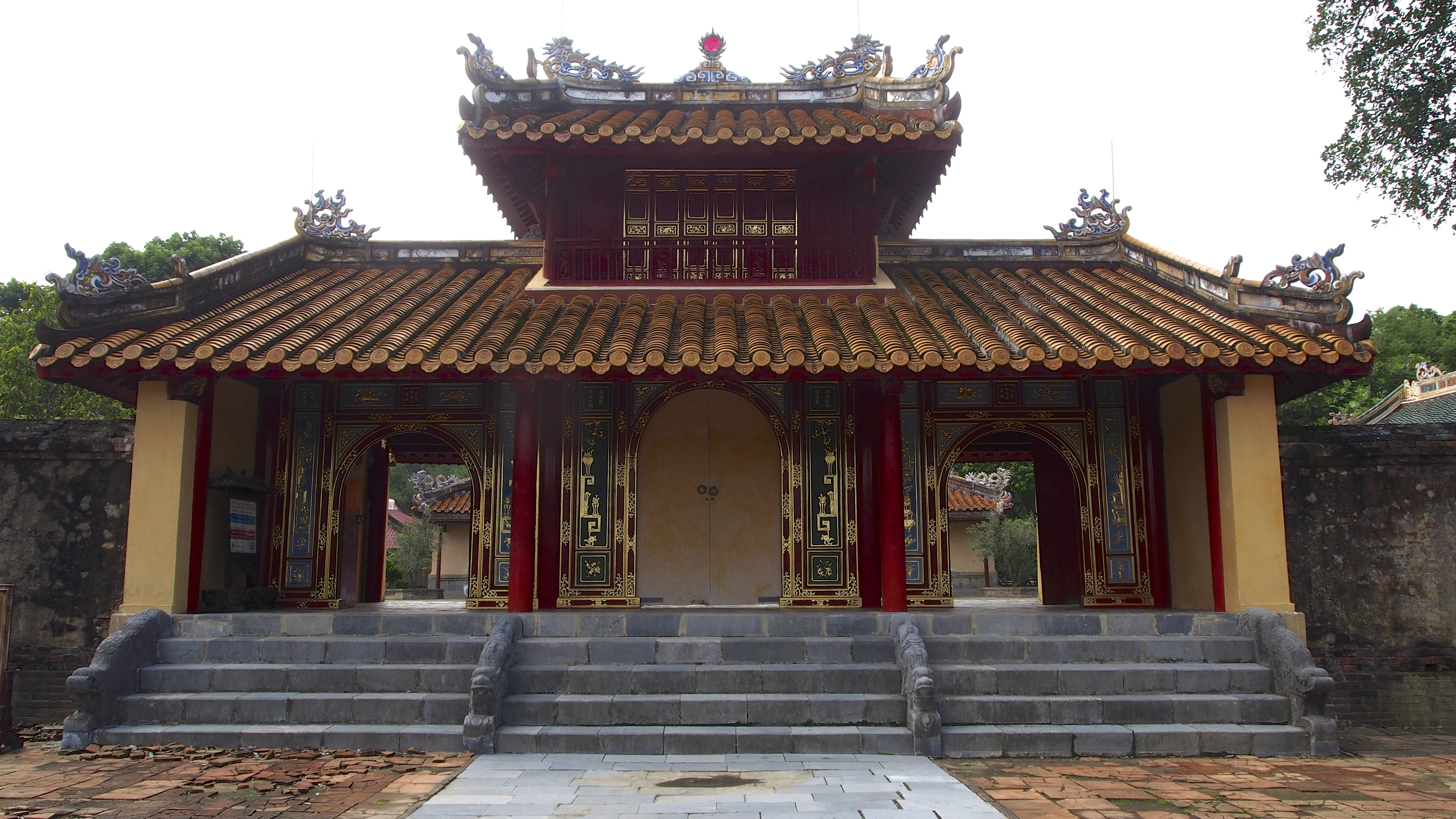
Tomb of Minh Mạng

Although he disagreed with European culture and thinking, he studied it closely and was known for his scholarly nature. Ming Mạng was keen in Western technologies, namely mechanics, weaponry and navigation which he attempted to introduce into Vietnam. Upon hearing of the vaccination against smallpox, he organised for a French surgeon to live in a palatial residence and vaccinate the royal family against the disease. He was learnèd in Eastern philosophy and was regarded as an intellectually oriented monarch. He was also known for his writings as a poet. He was known for his attention to detail and micromanagement of state affairs, to a level that "astonished his contemporaries". As a result, he was held in high regard for his devotion to running the country. When Minh Mạng died, he left the throne to his son, Emperor Thiệu Trị, who was more rigidly Confucianist and anti-imperialist than his father. During Thiệu Trị's reign, diplomatic standoffs precipitated by aspiring European imperial powers on the pretext of the "treatment" of Catholic priests gave them an excuse to use gunboat diplomacy on Vietnam, and led to increasing raids and the eventual colonisation of Vietnam by France. Nevertheless, during his reign, Minh Mạng had established a more efficient government, stopped a Siamese invasion and built many national monuments in the imperial city of Huế.

== Family and succession ==
Minh Mạng had a large number of wives and concubines. He is reported to have fathered 142 children from 43 wives. His sons included: Miên Tông (Emperor Thiệu Trị), Miên Định (Prince of Thọ Xuân), Miên Thẩm (Prince of Tùng Thiện), Miên Trinh (Prince of Tuy Lý), Miên Bửu (Prince of Tương An), Miên Lâm (Prince of Hoài Đức), Miên Triện (Prince of Hoằng Hóa), Miên Lịch (Yên Thành). Three of his daughters, Nguyệt Đình, Mai Am and Huệ Phố, were famous poets.

Minh Mạng's sons also had a remarkable number of offspring: Prince of Thọ Xuân fathered 144 children, including 78 sons and 66 daughters, Prince of Tuy Lý, another son, had 77 sons and 37 daughters. He is succeeded by Emperor Thiệu Trị, who himself fathered 29 princes and 35 princesses.

He decided to name his descendants (Nguyễn Phước or Nguyễn Phúc: all members of the Nguyễn dynasty) by choosing the Generation name following the words of the Imperial succession poem to avoid confusion. For boys, the following poem is shown in Chữ Quốc Ngữ (modern Vietnamese script) and in chữ nôm:

Đế Hệ Thi
Miên Hường Ưng Bửu Vĩnh
Bảo Quý Định Long Trường
Hiền Năng Kham Kế Thuật
Thế Thoại Quốc Gia Xương.

帝系詩
綿洪膺寶永
保貴定隆長
賢能堪繼述
世瑞國嘉昌

Note: Hường replaced Hồng and Thoại replaced Thụy because it was taboo to use the names of passed emperors or fathers.

The meaning of each name is roughly given as follows:

Name	Meaning	Example of successor
Miên	respecting above all the rules of life, such as meeting and parting, life and death (Trường cửu, phước duyên trên hết)	Miên Tông, Thiệu Trị Emperor (1807–1847), son of Minh Mạng
Hường (Hồng)	building a harmonious family (Oai hùng, đúc kết thế gia)	Hồng Nhậm, Tự Đức Emperor (1829–1883), son of Thiệu Trị
Ưng	establishing a prosperous country (Nên danh, xây dựng sơn hà)	Ưng Thị, Đồng Khánh Emperor (1864–1889), adopted son of Tự Đức
Bửu	being helpful and caring toward the common people (Bối báu, lợi tha quần chúng)	Bửu Đảo, Khải Định Emperor (1885–1925), son of Đồng Khánh
Vĩnh	having a good reputation (Bền chí, hùng ca anh tụng)	Vĩnh Thụy, Bảo Đại Emperor (1913–1997), son of Khải Định
Bảo	being courageous (Ôm lòng, khí dũng bình sanh)	Nguyễn Phước Bảo Ân (1951–), son of Bảo Đại
Quý	being elegant (Cao sang, vinh hạnh công thành)	Nguyễn Phước Quý Khang (1977–), son of Bảo Ân
Định	being decisive (Tiền quyết, thi hành oanh liệt)	Nguyễn Phước Định Lai, Nguyễn Phước Định Luân (2012–), twin sons of Quý Khang
Long	having a typically royal appearance (Vương tướng, rồng tiên nối nghiệp)	
Trường	being long-lasting (Vĩnh cửu, nối tiếp giống nòi)	
Hiền	being humane (Tài đức, phúc ấm sáng soi)	
Năng	being talented (Gương nơi khuôn phép bờ cõi)	
Kham	being hard-working and versatile (Đảm đương, mọi cơ cấu giỏi)	
Kế	being well-organized (Hoạch sách, mây khói cân phân)	
Thuật	being truthful in speech (Biên chép, lời đúng ý dân)	
Thế	being faithful to the family (Mãi thọ, cận thân gia tộc)	
Thoại (Thụy)	being wealthy (Ngọc quý, tha hồ phước tộc)	
Quốc	being admired by the citizens (Dân phục, nằm gốc giang san)	
Gia	being well-established (Muôn nhà, Nguyễn vẫn huy hoàng)	
Xương	bringing prosperity to the world (Phồn thịnh, bình an thiên hạ)	

Girls receive also a different name on each generation, for example: Công-chúa, Công-nữ, Công Tôn-nữ, Công-tằng Tôn-nữ, Công-huyền Tôn-nữ, Lai-huyền Tôn-nữ, or shorten to Tôn-nữ for all generations afterward.

Minh Mạng Nguyễn dynasty Died: 1841
Preceded by Gia Long	Emperor of Vietnam; 1820–1840	Succeeded by Thiệu Trị
