= Nguyễn Phúc Luân =

Nguyễn Phúc Luân or Nguyễn Phúc Côn (阮福㫻, 24 October 1733– 30 January 1765) was a son of lord Nguyễn Phúc Khoát and father of Nguyễn Phúc Ánh (future emperor Gia Long of Vietnam).

== Life ==
Luan was the second son of lord Nguyễn Phúc Khoát and he was the prince who would succeed to the title of lord. After lord Khoat's death, an overpowered mandarin named Trương Phúc Loan changed lord Khoat's will to make Luan's younger brother Nguyễn Phúc Thuần to be the next ruler. Later, Trương Phúc Loan imprisoned Luan until his death in 1765.

Luan was buried at Cơ Thánh Tomb, located at Cư Chánh, Hưng Thuỷ, Thừa Thiên Huế. Later, his son Nguyễn Phúc Ánh posthumously gave him the title Nhân Minh Cẩn Hậu Khoan Dụ Ôn Hòa Hiếu Khang Hoàng Đế (仁明謹厚寬裕溫和孝康皇帝).

== Family ==
Nguyễn Phúc Luân had three wives: Nguyễn Thị Hoàn - mother of Đồng, Ánh (Gia Long), Điển, and Ngọc Tú; Hoàn's elder sister - mother of Hạo, Mân, Ngọc Du, Ngọc Tuyền and one son who died as an infant; and Tống Thị Diên - mother of Ngọc Uyển.

Sons

- Nguyễn Phúc Hạo (阮福暭)
- Nguyễn Phúc Đồng (阮福晍)
- Nguyễn Phúc Ánh (later emperor Gia Long)
- unnamed (this son died after several days, no information was recorded)
- Nguyễn Phúc Mân (阮福旻)
- Nguyễn Phúc Điển (阮福晪)

All of them later were killed in battle with the Tây Sơn, except Nguyễn Phúc Ánh.

Daughters

- Nguyễn Phúc Ngọc Tú [阮氏玉琇; 1760 - 1825], Gia Long's elder sister. She was buried at Tomb of Gia Long.
- Nguyễn Phúc Ngọc Du (阮福玉瑜; 1761 - 1820), Gia Long's half sister, later became wife of Võ Tánh.
- Nguyễn Phúc Ngọc Tuyền [阮福玉璿; ? - 1782]
- Nguyễn Phúc Ngọc Uyển [阮福玉琬; 1765 - 1810]
