= Cao Bá Nhạ =

Vietnamese poet

Cao Bá Nhạ (fl. 1855) was a Vietnamese poet. He was born in Phu Thi Village, Gia Lam District. He was the son of Cao Bá Đạt and a nephew of Cao Bá Quát. In 1855, due to Cao Bá Quát's failure in battle, Emperor Tự Đức ordered to execute all generations of his family. He had to change his name and had to escape.

Finally, he resides in Huong Son district, My Duc district, Ha Dong province (now in Hanoi), earning a living as a teacher. Here, he married wife, but only lived about eight years before he was arrested and discharged through prisons in Hanoi, Hai Duong and Bac Ninh. He was then exiled and died.
