= Thân Văn Nhiếp =

Official of the Nguyễn dynasty

Thân Văn Nhiếp 申文㦪
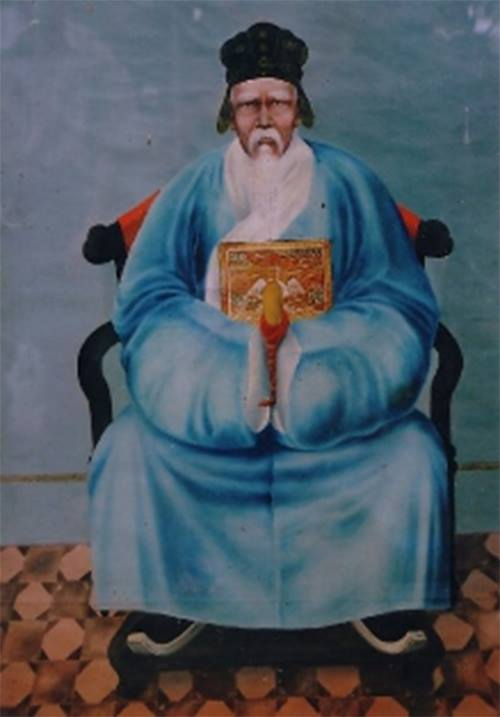
- The portrait painting of official Thân Văn Nhiếp.
- Born: 1804; Huế, Annam
- Died: 1872 (aged 67–68); Huế, Annam
- Education: Sinology
- Alma mater: Hương tiến
- Occupation: Public prosecutor
- Children: 3 sons
- Relatives: Thân Văn Quyền (father)

Thân Văn Nhiếp (chữ Hán: 申文㦪, 1804 – 1872), courtesy name Ngưng Chi (凝之), pseudonym Lỗ Đình (魯亭), was the official of the Nguyễn dynasty.

== Biography ==
Thân Văn Nhiếp was born on 28 September 1804 at the capital of Huế. His father was known as an excellent student, by the troubled times of Tay Son era so he hasn't take the Civil Service Exams to be the village teacher. When he was 53, or the 4th year of Minh Mệnh era, he was commended to be an official by his acquaintance.

== Family ==
- Father : Thân Văn Quyền.
- Sons : Thân Trọng Trữ, Thân Trọng Huề, Thân Trọng Thuận.
