= Thuận Thiên (Nguyễn dynasty empress) =

Thuận Thiên Cao Hoàng Hậu 順天高皇后
- Empress Thuận Thiên

Empress mother of the Nguyễn dynasty
- Tenure: 1820–1840
- Predecessor: Empress Mother Ý Tĩnh
- Successor: Empress Mother Từ Dụ

Grand Empress mother of the Nguyễn dynasty
- Tenure: 1840–1846
- Predecessor: none
- Successor: Grand Empress Mother Từ Dụ

Empress consort of the Nguyễn dynasty
- Tenure: title granted posthumously
- Predecessor: Empress Thừa Thiên
- Successor: Empress Tá Thiên
- Born: January 4, 1769; Văn Xá village, Hương Trà, Thừa Thiên
- Died: November 6, 1846 (aged 77); Phú Xuân, Việt Nam
- Burial: Thiên Thọ Hữu Tomb; Hương Trà, Thừa Thiên Huế
- Spouse: Emperor Gia Long
- Issue: Nguyễn Phúc Đảm (Emperor Minh Mạng); Nguyễn Phúc Đài, Prince of Kiến An; Nguyễn Phúc Chẩn, Prince of Thiệu Hóa
Names
- Trần Thị Đang (陳氏璫)
Posthumous name
- Short: Thuận Thiên Cao Hoàng Hậu 順天高皇后; Full: Thuận Thiên Hưng Thánh Quang Dụ Hóa Cơ Nhân Tuyên Từ Khánh Đức Trạch Nguyên Công Cao Hoàng hậu 順天興聖光裕化基仁宣慈慶德澤元功高皇后
- House: Nguyễn Phúc (by marriage)
- Father: Trần Hưng Đạt
- Mother: Lady Lê

Empress Thuận Thiên (Vietnamese: Thuận Thiên Cao Hoàng Hậu, January 4, 1769 – November 6, 1846), born Trần Thị Đang in Văn Xá village, Hương Trà, Thừa Thiên, was the second wife of Emperor Gia Long of Vietnam and mother of Emperor Minh Mạng.

== Family and childhood ==
Trần Thị Đang was born to Trần Hưng Đạt, a scholar who then served Hanlin Academy under Nguyễn lords, and his first wife, lady Lê Thị Cầm in 1769 at Văn Xá village of Hương Trà district. A daughter from a reputable family, during the 1774 offensive she was chosen as maidservant to Queen Mother Ý Tĩnh - mother of lord Nguyễn Phúc Ánh (later Emperor Gia Long) - who sought asylum in Cửa Tùng. One year later, her father and uncle was seized by Trịnh lord’s army in Quảng Nam. Despite having escaped, they were unable to come back to the South, thus presumed dead for nearly 18 years.

== Wife of Gia Long ==
In 1779, Đang went South to Gia Định along with Nguyễn Ánh’s sisters following Queen Mother Ý Tĩnh. She became the lord’s concubine (左宮嬪; lit. 'Concubine of the Left') two years later at the age of 14 and was then commonly called by the title of Nhị phi (二妃; lit. or 'Second wife').

Legend has it that one night in 1788, after Nguyễn Ánh had conquered Gia Định, she dreamt of a deity giving her one brilliant red imperial seal and two common ones. The dream was later regarded by posterity as prophetic and the seals represented her three children, with the imperial seal being her first-born who would ascend to the throne years afterwards.

Đang stood by Nguyễn Ánh during the time he was fighting Tây Sơn and went on to have three sons with the Emperor: Nguyễn Phúc Đảm (1791 - 1840; later Emperor Minh Mạng), Nguyễn Phúc Đài (1795 - 1849) and Nguyễn Phúc Chẩn (1803 - 1824).

== Later life and death ==
As Minh Mạng took the throne after Gia Long's death, Đang became Empress Mother. Following her grandson Thiệu Trị's accession, Đang was elevated to the title Grand Empress Mother Nhân Tuyên Từ Khánh Thượng Thọ in 1841. She died in 1846, aged 77, her tomb lies on the right of Gia Long's Lăng Thiên Thọ. She received the title of Empress posthumously.
