= Nguyễn Phúc Miên Thẩm =

- Tùng Thiện Vương (Prince Tùng Thiện of the 1st Rank)
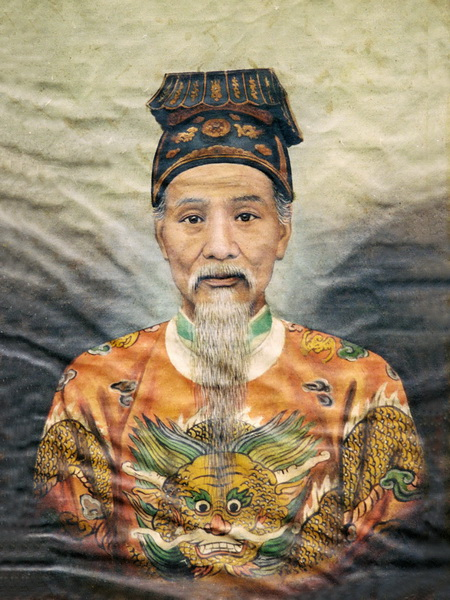
- Nguyễn Phúc Miên Thẩm
- Born: 11 December 1819
- Died: 30 April 1870 (aged 50)
Posthumous name
- Văn Nhã (文雅)
- Father: Emperor Minh Mạng
- Mother: Nguyễn Thị Bửu

Nguyễn Phúc Miên Thẩm (chữ Hán: 阮福綿審, 11 December 1819 – 1 April 1870), courtesy name Trọng Uyên (仲淵), pseudonym Bạch Hào Tử (白毫子), was a prince of Nguyễn dynasty, Vietnam.

== Life ==
Born Nguyễn Phúc Hiện (阮福晛), was the tenth son of Minh Mạng, and his mother was Nguyễn Thị Bửu. He was granted the title Tùng Thiện Vương (從善王, "Prince of Tùng Thiện").

== As a poet ==
He was good at writing Chinese poetry. Emperor Tự Đức, set a high value on his poetry: "Former Han proses are not worth comparing with those written by Siêu and Quát; (the quality of) High Tang poetry are surpassed by those written by Tùng and Tuy" (Classical Chinese: 文如超适無前漢 詩到從綏失盛唐; Vietnamese: Văn như Siêu, Quát vô tiền Hán; Thi đáo Tùng, Tuy thất thịnh Đường). One of his works, Thương Sơn thi tập, was taken to Qing China by Vietnamese envoys in 1854, and circulated around in China.

He and Nguyễn Phúc Miên Trinh (Prince of Tuy Lý), Nguyễn Phúc Miên Bửu (Prince of Tương An), were known as "Tam Đường" (三堂) of Nguyễn dynasty.

Miên Thẩm was a member of Mạc Vân thi xã ("Mạc Vân Poetry Society"). Nguyễn Phúc Miên Định (Prince of Thọ Xuân), Nguyễn Phúc Miên Thủ (Prince of Hàm Thuận), Nguyễn Phúc Miên Trinh (Prince of Tuy Lý), Nguyễn Phúc Miên Bửu (Prince of Tương An), Nguyễn Phúc Miên Triện (Prince of Hoằng Hóa), Nguyễn Văn Siêu, Cao Bá Quát, Hà Tôn Quyền, Phan Thanh Giản and Nguyễn Đăng Giai were also members of this poetry society.
