= Yên Sơn district =

Coordinates: 21.833°N 105.333°E

Yên Sơn District Huyện Yên Sơn
- District
- Interactive map of Yên Sơn District
- Country: Vietnam
- Region: Northeast
- Province: Tuyên Quang
- Capital: Tân Bình

Area
  - Total: 470 sq mi (1,210 km^{2})

Population (2003)
  - Total: 175,917
- Time zone: UTC+7 (UTC + 7)

Yên Sơn is a former rural district of Tuyên Quang province, in the Northeast region of Vietnam. As of 2003 the district had a population of 175,917. The district covers an area of 1210 km^{2}. The district capital lies at Tân Bình.

== Administrative divisions ==
Tân Bình, Đội Bình, Nhữ Khê, Nhữ Hán, Mỹ Bằng, Phú Lâm, Kim Phú, Hoàng Khai, Chân Sơn, Trung Môn, Lang Quán, Thắng Quân, Tứ Quận, Phúc Ninh, Chiêu Yên, Lực Hành, Quý Quân, Xuân Vân, Tân Long, Tân Tiến, Trung Trực, Kiến Thiết, Đạo Viện, Phú Thịnh, Thái Bình, Tiến Bộ, Công Đa, Kim Quan, Trung Sơn, Hùng Lợi, Trung Minh.
