= Thừa Thiên (empress) =

Thừa Thiên Cao Hoàng Hậu 承天高皇后
- Empress Thừa Thiên
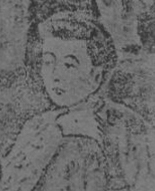

Empress consort of the Nguyễn dynasty
- Tenure: 1806 – 1814
- Predecessor: none
- Successor: Empress Thuận Thiên
- Born: January 19, 1762; Tống Sơn district, Thanh Hóa province
- Died: February 22, 1814 (aged 52); Phú Xuân, Việt Nam
- Burial: Thiên Thọ Tomb
- Spouse: Emperor Gia Long
- Issue: Nguyễn Phúc Chiêu; Nguyễn Phúc Cảnh, Crown Prince Anh Duệ
Names
- Tống Phúc Thị Lan (宋福氏蘭)
Posthumous name
- Thừa Thiên Tá Thánh Hậu Đức Từ Nhân Giản Cung Tề Hiếu Dục Chính Thuận Nguyên Cao hoàng hậu 承天佐聖厚德慈仁簡恭齊孝翼正順元高皇后
- House: Nguyễn Phúc (by marriage)
- Father: Tống Phúc Khuông
- Mother: Lady Lê

Empress Thừa Thiên (Vietnamese: Thừa Thiên Cao Hoàng Hậu; chữ Hán: 承天高皇后, 1762–1814), born Tống Phúc Thị Lan (宋福氏蘭), was the first wife of Nguyễn Phúc Ánh (future Emperor Gia Long) and mother of Crown Prince Nguyễn Phúc Cảnh.

She was a daughter of general Tống Phước Khuông of the Nguyễn lords. Nguyễn Ánh married her when he was 18. Empress Thừa Thiên had two sons with Gia Long: Nguyen Phuc Chieu (who died after several days) and Crown Prince Nguyễn Phúc Cảnh. After her death, she was buried at Gia Long's Thiên Thọ tomb, alongside the Emperor.
