= Hương Trà (town) =

Coordinates: 16°28′3″N 107°31′5″E

- District-level town (Class-4)
- Hương Trà Town; Thị xã Hương Trà
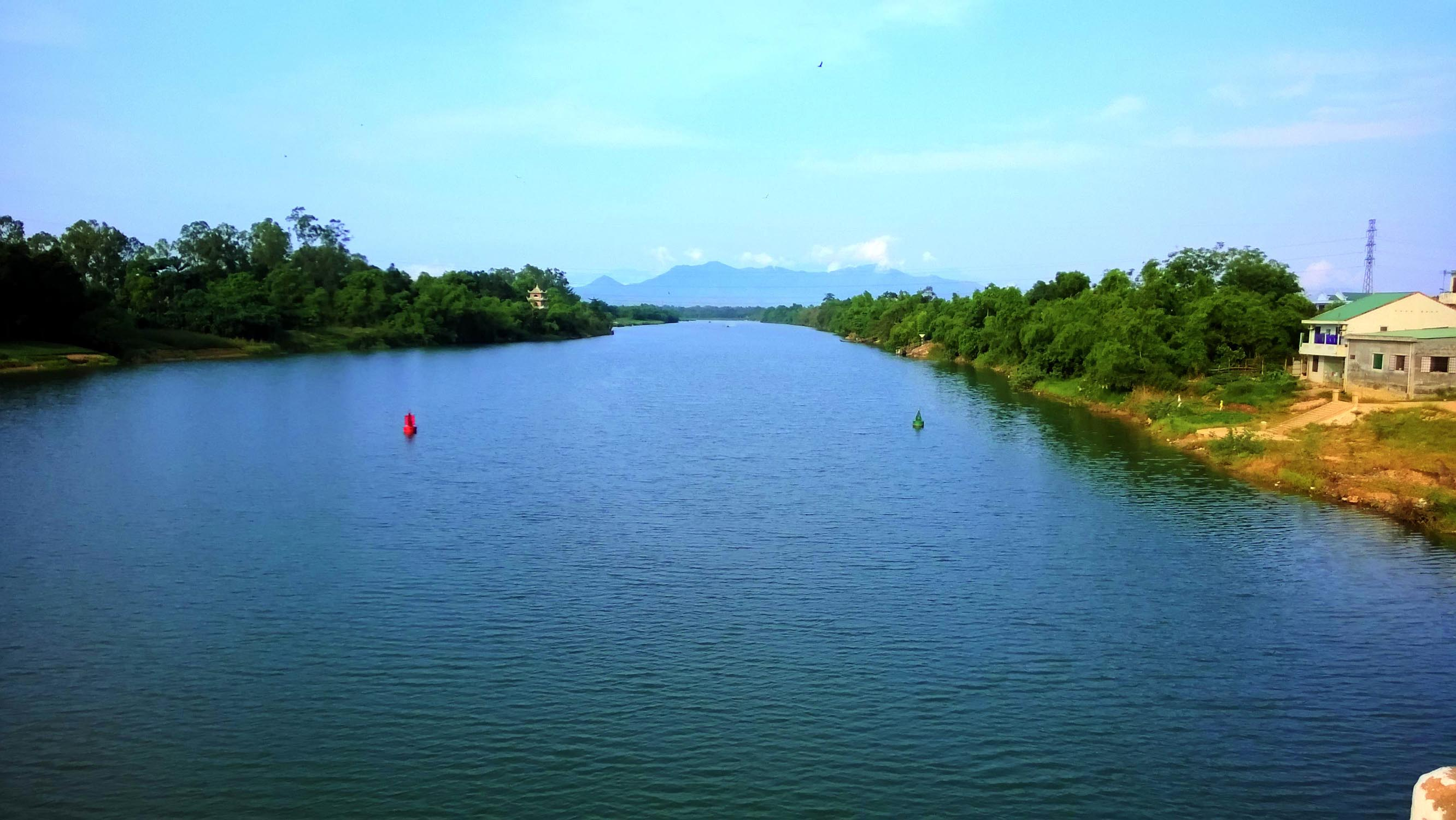
- Bồ River flowing through Hương Trà town
- Country: Vietnam
- Region: North Central Coast
- Municipality: Huế
- Capital: Tứ Hạ

Area
  - Total: 151.48 sq mi (392.32 km^{2})

Population (2020)
  - Total: 72,677
- Time zone: UTC+7 (UTC + 7)
- Website: huongtra.hue.gov.vn

Hương Trà is a former district-level town (thị xã) of Huế in the North Central Coast region of Vietnam. As of 2020 the town had a population of 72,677. The town covers an area of 392.32 km^{2} (151.48 sq mi). The district capital lies at Tứ Hạ.

Hương Trà town is bordered by the city of Huế to the east, Phong Điền District to the west, Hương Thủy town and A Lưới District to the south and Quảng Điền District to the north. The area has both mountainous terrain and plains.

The town consists of the 5 phường (ward): Tứ Hạ, Hương Văn, Hương Xuân, Hương Vân, Hương Chữ and 4 xã (commune): Hương Toàn, Bình Thành, Bình Tiến, Hương Bình. Tứ Hạ is located on National Road 1A, the nation's main north-south artery, 16 km north of Huế.
