= Tây Sơn wars =

Vietnamese military conflicts (1771–1802)

Tây Sơn wars Vietnamese Civil war of 1771–1802
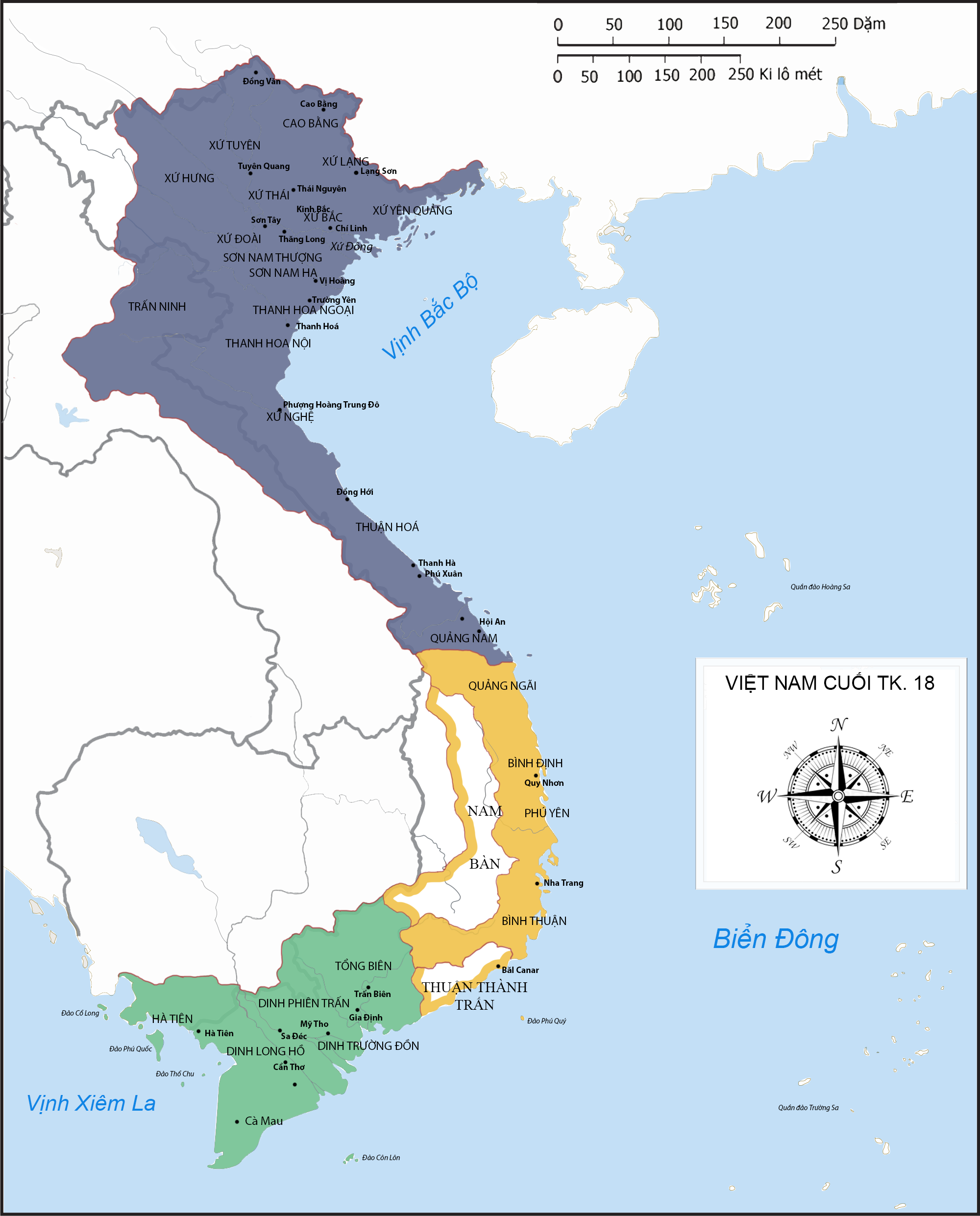
- Vietnam in 1792. Nguyễn lords' territories is the green area; while The yellow and the dark areas were under control of Tây Sơn leaders Nguyễn Nhạc and Nguyễn Huệ.
Date	1 August 1771 – 22 July 1802 (30 years, 11 months, and 22 days)
Location	Vietnam, Laos, Cambodia, South China Sea
Result	Final Nguyễn victory: Đại Việt united under Emperor Gia Long; Phú Xuân became the capital of new dynasty; Start of Nguyễn Dynasty

Belligerents
Tây Sơn; Cham people Chinese Vietnamese (1771–1777); Pirates of the South China Coast	Nguyễn lords Khmer; Siam; France (1778–1802, limited); Kingdom of Vientiane; Chinese Vietnamese (Hoà Nghĩa army)	Trịnh lords (1775, 1785–1786)	Qing dynasty (1788–1789); Royal Vietnamese army under Lê Chiêu Thống

Commanders and leaders
Nguyễn Nhạc # Nguyễn Huệ # Nguyễn Lữ # Nguyễn Quang Toản (executed); Ngô Văn Sở (executed); Lý Tài (1771–1775); Po Tisuntiraidapuran (executed); Chen Tianbao; Zheng Yi †	Nguyễn Phúc Thuần (executed); Nguyễn Phúc Ánh; Đỗ Thanh Nhơn (executed); Lê Văn Duyệt; Lý Tài † (1775–1777); Po Ladhuanpuguh # Rama I Chaophraya Aphaiphubet (Baen); Nanthasen # (Kingdom of France) Louis XVI (diplomatic only) (Kingdom of France) Pierre Pigneau de Behaine (Kingdom of France) Jean-Baptiste Chaigneau (Kingdom of France) Jean-Marie Dayot (Kingdom of France) Olivier de Puymanel	Trịnh Sâm # Hoàng Ngũ Phúc # Trịnh Khải (executed); Trịnh Bồng #	(Qing dynasty) Sun Shiyi (Qing dynasty) Cen Yidong †; Lê Chiêu Thống

Strength
Tây Sơn: 25,000 (1774); 200,000 (1794-peak) South China sea pirates: 50,000 (1802)	Nguyễn lord: 80,000 (1771); 140.000 (1802); Siamese: 50,000; Cambodian: 20,000 (Kingdom of France) France: 1,600 mercenaries	Trịnh lords: More than 150,000 (1786)	(Qing dynasty) China: 60,000–200,000 (1788–1789)

Casualties and losses
- More than 1-2 million people

The Tây Sơn wars or Tây Sơn rebellion, often known as the Vietnamese civil war of 1771–1802, were a series of military conflicts that followed the Vietnamese peasant uprising at Tây Sơn (in Central Vietnam) that were led by three brothers: Nguyễn Nhạc, Nguyễn Huệ, and Nguyễn Lữ. These revolutionary forces grew and later overthrew the ruling Vietnamese elite families and the ruling Lê dynasty. The Tây Sơn leaders installed themselves as rulers of Vietnam that held power until they were overthrown by Nguyễn Phúc Ánh, a descendant of the Nguyễn lord who was previously overthrown by the Tây Sơn. The war ended in 1802 when Nguyễn Phúc Ánh (now called Emperor Gia Long) defeated the Tây Sơn and reunited Đại Việt, then renamed the country to Vietnam.

== Background ==
=== Breakdown of royal rule in the 16th century ===
The origin of the conflicts was back to the 15th century, when the Vietnamese monarch Lê Thánh Tông (r. 1460 – 1497) started adopting Ming-inspired Confucian reforms over the country. Under his rule, the country became a prosperous regional superpower and its population expanded from 1.8 million in 1417 to 4.5 million people at the end of his reign. The Lê royal family indefinitely exchanging Confucian niceties over the question of responsibility. He brought Dong-Kinh scholars and Thanh-Nghe warriors into his government. Lê Thánh Tông transformed Đại Việt into a centralized bureaucratic state with a strongly Confucian character and established the Nam-giao (Ch. Nan-chiao), a sacrifice to Heaven, as the new central state ritual. To staff the new bureaucracy, the Le dynasty king, referred to as an emperor in the Vietnamese records, for the first time consistently utilized the triennial examination system of the Ming dynasty to recruit scholars for appointment in the civil service. This administrative system constituted the Hong Duc model, named after the second of Le Thanh Tong's two reign periods. Meanwhile, Đại Việt sent missions to China which the court considered tribute missions; the Ming court enfeoffed the Vietnamese ruler as the "king of Annam", while domestically the Vietnamese used rhetoric which placed their court on equal footing with the Ming empire. However, after his death and that of his son Lê Hiến Tông (r. 1498 – 1504), the governance system of the royal family faltered. The decline began when Lê Uy Mục seized the throne of Đại Việt in 1505, murdering his grandmother and two ministers and ushering in an era of instability. The ruling Lê family, originally from Thanh Hóa in the south of Đại Việt, was increasingly dependent at court on two other leading Thanh Hóa military clans, the Trịnh and the Nguyễn. The Lê dynasty increasingly fell victim to intrigue between these competing clans. Bloodshed erupted in 1505–9, briefly forcing the Nguyễn clan back to Thanh Hóa. Extreme weather beset the kingdom in the early 16th century, with drought periods in 1503 and 1504 and typhoons and floods occurring in the Red River Delta every year from 1512 to 1517, causing a rapid decline of the economy. Instability, famines, epidemics, disasters, peasant revolts and a quick succession of eight rulers, six of whom were assassinated, led to the downfall of Đại Việt among Southeast Asian powers.

In 1527, a high-rank military officer of the weakened court, Mạc Đăng Dung, sought to restore the Hong-duc bureaucratic model. He deposed the ruling Lê monarch, Lê Cung Hoàng, and made himself ruler of Đại Việt. The Mạc kings reestablished a brief period of peace and stability over the country, promoted the restoration of Vietnamese Buddhism, and encouraged Vietnamese folk religion. In 1529 a loyalist to the old royal family, Nguyễn Kim, went to Lan Xang and submitted to King Photisarath (r. 1520 – 1547). Photisarath made Nguyễn Kim administrator of the territory of Xam Neua. In Đại Việt, Mạc Đăng Dung suppressed the Lê loyalists in Thanh Hóa, forcing the Lê remnants to seek refuge in Nguyễn Kim's domain. In 1533, Nguyễn Kim proclaimed prince Lê Duy Ninh (son of emperor Lê Chiêu Tông) as king of Đại Việt. Photisarath acknowledged this claim and allocated resources to support it. Envoys were sent to Ming China in 1536 and 1537 to denounce Mạc Đăng Dung as a usurper and to request an intervention to restore the legitimate dynasty. The Ming emperor Jiajing sent 110,000 troops to the border to invade Đại Việt. Fearing of a new Chinese invasion and the Lê revivalists, Mạc Đăng Dung and his ministers submitted themselves to the Ming. The empire reclassified their country as no longer an independent vassal state, but gave the Mạc dynasty permission to administer it as "Commissioner of Annan" (An-nan tu-t'ung shih). Đại Việt's status in the tribute system was thus reduced from that of a monarchy to a superior form of pacification commission and this lasted even after the Mạc family was overthrown in 1592.

=== Civil war (1545–1592) ===
Without Ming intervention, the Lê family slowly made their way back to power aided by members of two powerful Thanh Hóa military clans, the Nguyễn and Trịnh. This effort continued through most of the sixteenth century, and in the course of the long seesaw struggle with the Mạc a rivalry emerged between the two families, represented by their principal figures, Nguyễn Kim and Trịnh Kiểm (1503–1570). This tension developed even though the families were not merely allied militarily, but were also linked through marriage. Nguyễn Kim had married one of his daughters to Trịnh Kiểm, thus binding the two families in a time-honored fashion. Neither the military nor the marital connections, however, could forestall Trịnh Kiểm's personal ambitions. The ongoing contest for political supremacy gradually saw the Trịnh gain the upper hand, a position that was secured when the Nguyễn paterfamilias was murdered at the hands of a surrendering Mạc general in 1545. Eager to eliminate his rivals, Trịnh Kiểm arranged to have the elder Nguyễn son killed.

With the Revival Lê headquarters in Thanh Hóa now dominated by thái sư Trịnh Kiểm and the Trịnh clan, Kim's younger son, Nguyễn Hoàng, obtained advice from the scholar Nguyễn Bỉnh Khiêm that the southern frontier territory. Nguyễn Hoàng, saw in this act his own fate unless he took measures to protect himself. Through his sister, Kiểm's wife, Hoàng requested that he be appointed governor general of the distant southern frontier territories of Thuận Hoá and Quảng Nam. Remote exile of this political challenger suited the Trịnh overlord, and he agreed to the request. Shortly thereafter, in 1558, Nguyễn Hoàng entered the southern realms, marking the beginnings of a political division that would remain in effect until the Tây Sơn epoch more than two centuries later. Aided by an entourage of noble families who had joined him in exile, and who now constituted the core of a ruling elite in the new territories, Nguyễn Hoàng rapidly built up political and economic strength in the territories under his control. Nguyễn Hoàng and the Trịnh clans however, continued their joint struggles to bring back the Lê monarch back to the capital Đông Kinh (Hanoi). In 1592, they retook the Red River Delta from the Mạc, forcing the Mạc family to retreat to Cao Bằng province on the border to Ming China. It is estimated that more than 440,000 people died during this civil war. The remnants of the Mạc clan, protected by the Ming, existed in their highland enclave on the northern border, separated from the support of scholar elites in the delta lowlands of Đông Kinh.

=== Trịnh–Nguyễn partition ===
In the next two centuries, the kingdom of Đại Việt was divided into two rival polities: the Trịnh lords ruled the North, known as Đàng Ngoài (Tonkin), the Nguyễn lords ruled the south, with Huế as the capital, known as Đàng Trong (Cochinchina), and the Lê monarch held the title of emperor under the control of Trịnh lords. Đại Việt enjoyed a short period of stability. Catholicism was welcomed and spread during the previous Lê–Mạc period, becaming more popular when many Jesuit missionaries arrived Vietnam after 1593. As the Manchu conquest disordered China and the availability of Chinese silk fell, Vietnamese silk began to enter the market and became an increasingly large part of the trade. Large profits could be made, and the Portuguese and Dutch endeavored to join this trade.

In 1624, Nguyễn Hoàng's son and successor, Nguyễn Phúc Nguyên, formally rejected a Trịnh demand for tax revenues, sparking the almost 45-year long (1627–1672) Trịnh-Nguyễn War, which was ultimately inconclusive. Both sides then accepted the military stalemate, and a de facto cease-fire emerged.

==== Trịnh Tonkin ====
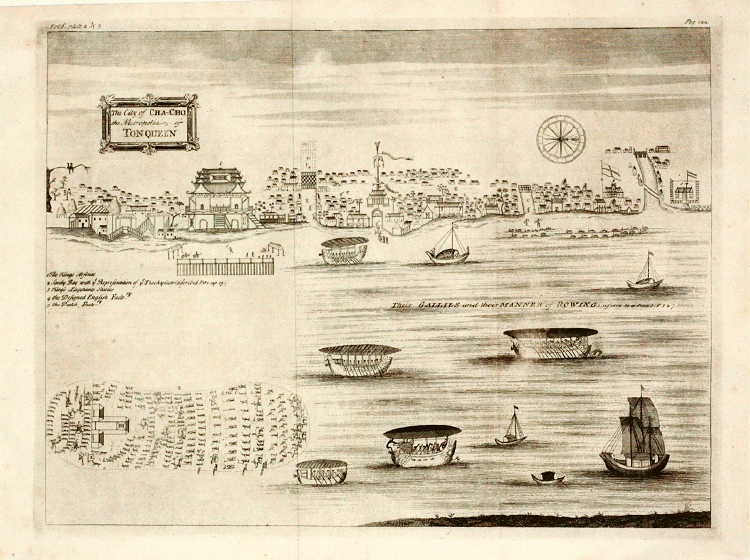
A view of Đông Kinh (Hanoi) from the Red River in 1685

In Tonkin, the Trịnh clan, led by Trịnh Tùng (c.1570–1623) did not seize the royal throne of Đại Việt. Having restored the Lê royal family to the throne of Đại Việt, Trịnh kept them there, married to Trịnh daughters, and maintained control of the court and the land as lords (V. chúa), not as kings. In 1674 the Trịnh called a halt to their military efforts at unification and worked instead to re-establish the Hong Duc model of governance. With the resolution of the problem of the Mạc on the northern border in Cao Bằng in 1677, diplomatic relations with the Qing dynasty settled into a predictable pattern of a tribute mission sent every three years or a double mission every six years, proceeding by land to present gold and silver objects. The result of these missions was a steady, asymmetric relationship that guaranteed Đại Việt its independence. The scholar-officials on these missions from Thang-Long absorbed the flourishing elements of Qing society during the long Kangxi reign.

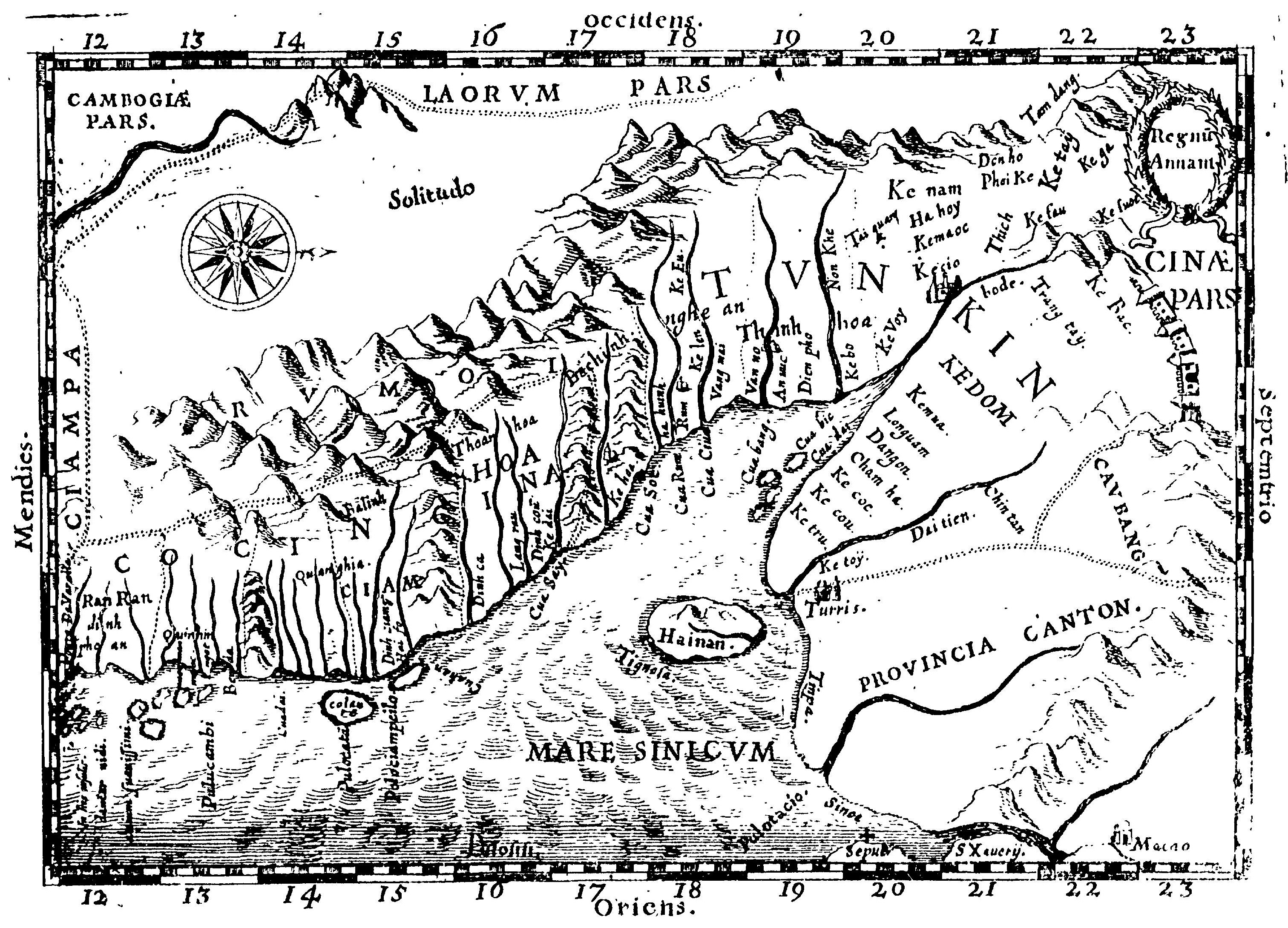
Map of Dai Viet by Alexandre de Rhodes in 1651

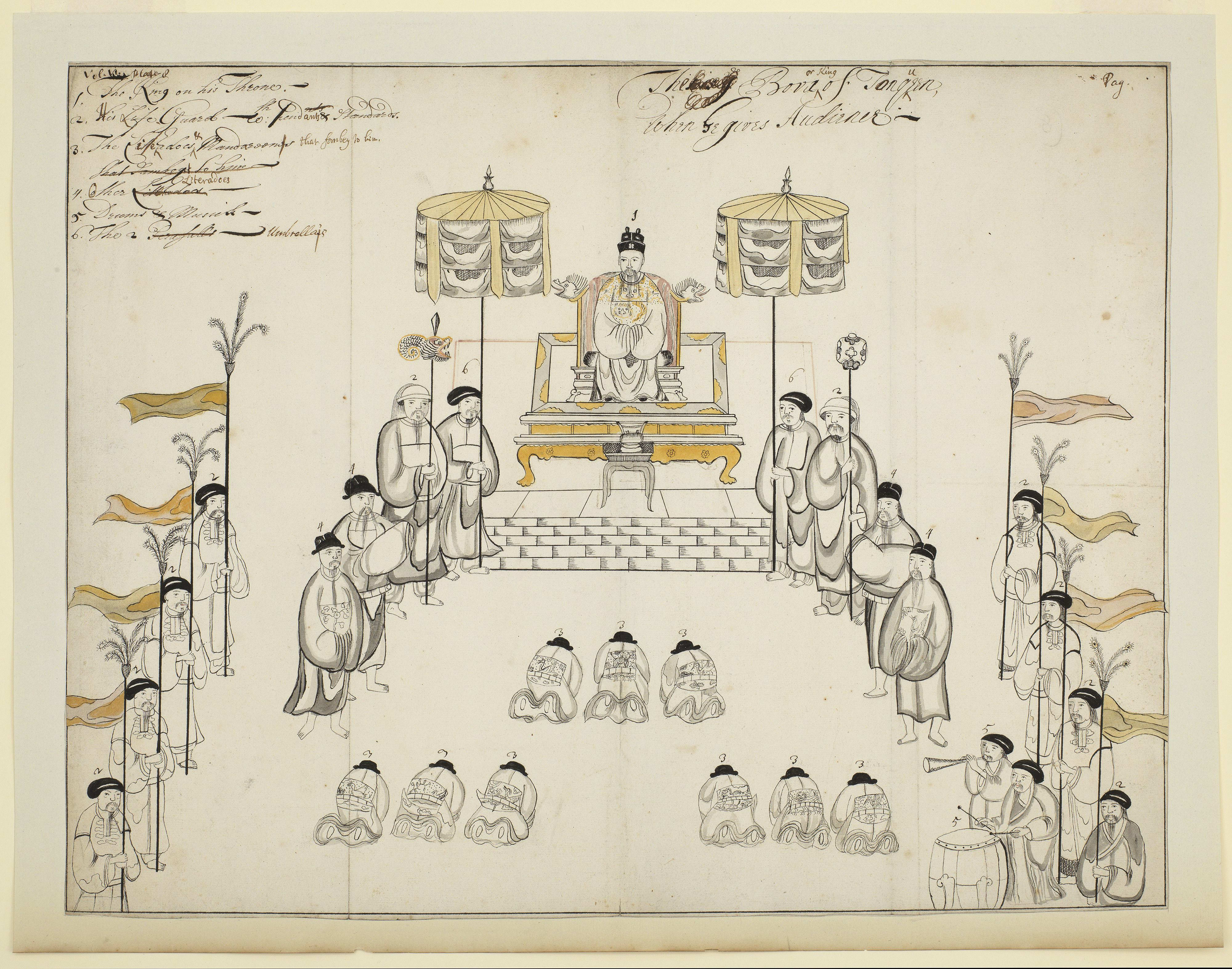
Emperor Lê Hy Tông gives an audience

The Trịnh developed their agricultural base, imposed their former centralized bureaucratic model, adopted scholar values, and had formal tributary ties with the Qing dynasty. The strengths, weaknesses, and Chinese connections of each system set the political trajectories through the eighteenth century. Unlike the Lê royals and scholar-officials who embraced Confucian values, much of the general Vietnamese populace remained Buddhist. Yet the spread of Confucian ideas, ancestral rites, and the growth of shrines, especially in north Vietnam, also brought social change, affecting the roles of women. Vietnamese women enjoyed a higher degree of gender equality than any other East Asian women. Mahayana Buddhism had a major revival. Catholicism became a presence in Vietnamese society at a number of different social levels. A 1784 estimate suggests that north Vietnam had a Catholic Christian population of 350,000 to 400,000, while southern Vietnam had about 10,000 to 15,000 Christians.

With peace, the population grew, and with the rise in population and productivity came an expansion of commercial activity. The marketplace was as much a positive point of interest to these Vietnamese officials as was the rice paddy. Since the Vietnamese had long used Chinese-style copper coins but did not have a sufficient supply of copper ore, the issue of a sound money supply was a crucial one in the rising economy. Đại Việt minted its own coins and also used coins minted in Nagasaki and Macao. Coinage was a major trade issue.The Trịnh also became involved in international commerce. For the first time, the major trading center was not at the fringe of Đại Việt, but at Phố Hiến, as well as at Kẻ Chợ on the riverbank at the capital Hanoi in the midst of Hanoi's population and upriver from the coast. Nevertheless, the central economic activity in the north was wet rice agriculture, and government finances were based on rice production. Public lands in the villages served as the fiscal basis of the realm. With a warm welcome from lord Trịnh Tráng, the Dutch East India Company (VOC) built a silk factory and established their ambassador in Hanoi in 1637. The silk trade in Tonkin reached its height in 1676 when the VOC imported 39,400,000 Japanese zeni coins to the Trịnh court for silk to be sold in Japan. In 1672, the English East India Company established a factory in Hanoi, but the Dutch blocked them for 4 years, due to the Third Anglo-Dutch War. In 1682, a French delegation brought a letter from Louis XIV to lord Trịnh Tạc. Trịnh Tạc responded by granting the French freedom to trade, but refused to allow Christian propagation. The extent of its walls confirms that the population of the Vietnamese capital of Hanoi was in excess of 100,000 throughout the period from the fifteenth to the mid-eighteenth century.

==== Nguyễn Cochinchina ====
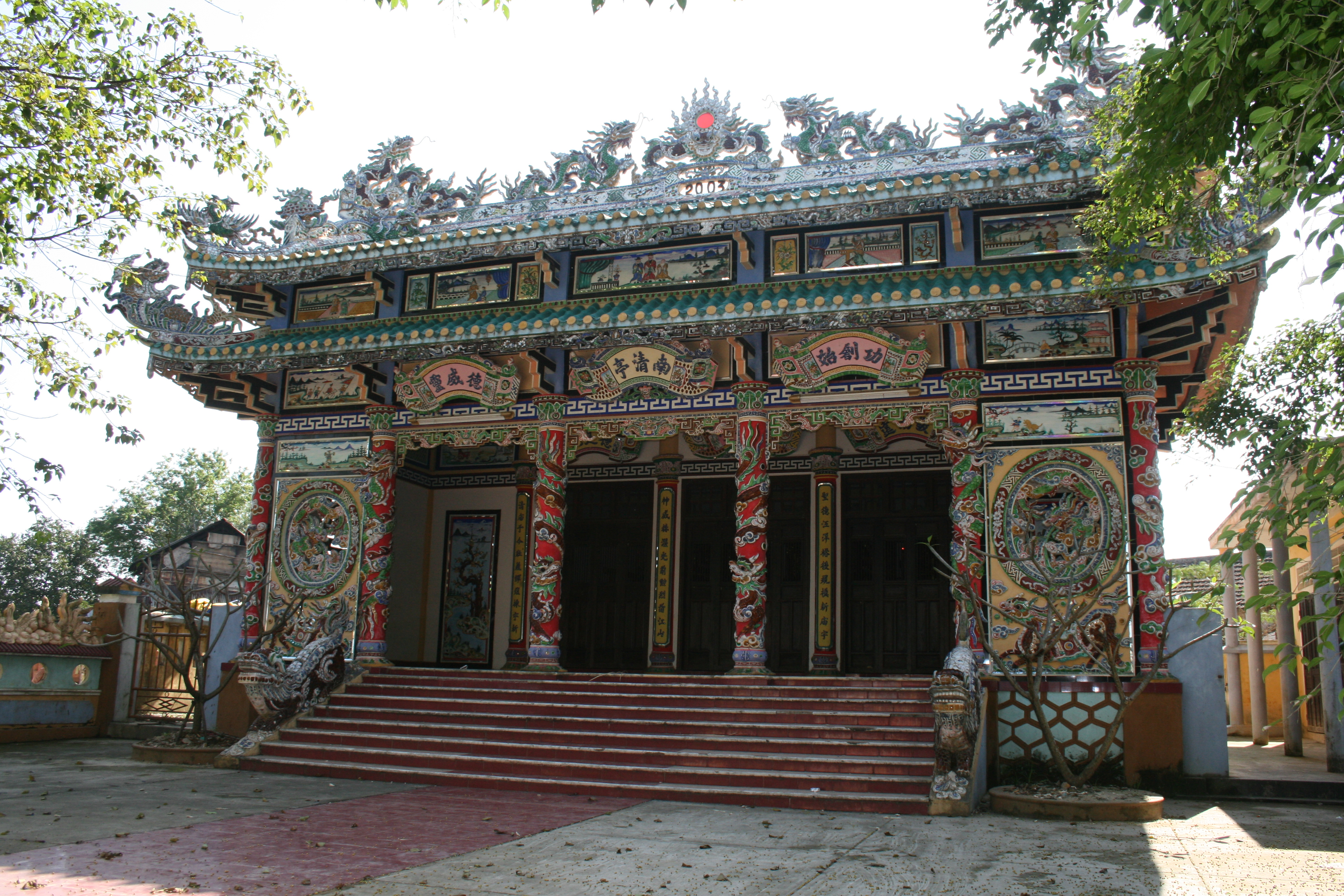
Vietnamese communal temple đình in Huế

Unlike northern Vietnam under Confucian influences, Nguyễn Cochinchina promoted Vietnamese Buddhism. Nguyễn lords replaced old Cham temples with pagodas. According to Pierre Poivre, around 1750 the Nguyễn lords had built 400 pagodas and shrines in Huế alone. Most of these pre-18th century southern Vietnamese pagodas were destroyed in the Tây Sơn rebellion, either because of their pro-Nguyễn associations or because the Tây Sơn had a policy of allowing only one pagoda for each district.

In terms of economy, Nguyễn Cochinchina largely relied on maritime trade, particularly trade with markets in Japan and China. The Nguyễn and their great port of Hội An benefited from a confluence of events. Private trade by Chinese had been officially sanctioned by the Ming government in 1567. A flow of Latin American silver was penetrating the region, as were Europeans, especially Portuguese in the early phase. In the late sixteenth century, civil war was gradually resolving the disunity of Japan, and ships and traders from western Japan were taking to the sea. Mining technology there was producing more silver that was introduced into the trade. In the early seventeenth century, Dutch and English ships joined in the trade. The main point in Hội An's favor as a port in the late sixteenth and early seventeenth centuries was that the Ming government wanted nothing to do with Japanese ships after decades of East Asian piracy, raids, and unregulated trading activities along its east and southeast coast, and then the Japanese invasions of Korea in the 1590s. As a result, Japanese traders and, after Japan's reunification in 1600, official Red seal ships (J. shuinsen) authorized by the Tokugawa regime, came to Hội An for their trade in Chinese goods. The local Vietnamese regime encouraged and profited from this trade, providing the entrepôt where Japanese merchants could meet private Fujianese traders. This thriving commerce then drew other traders, including Southeast Asians and Europeans, to Hội An. From the 1640s to 1700, trade in southern Vietnam brought an average 580,000 taels of revenue each year for the Nguyễn court. A Portuguese mestizo, Joan da Cruz, offered his services to the Nguyễn Cochinchina and established a foundry in Huế to build guns in the European way. Through the seventeenth century, the city of Hội An and the central coast of Vietnam thrived. Chinese ships went from Southeast Asian ports, especially Hội An, to Japan. The cargo loaded in Hội An was mainly Chinese and local Vietnamese silk and sugar that was traded for Japanese copper and silver, and many other products as well. The port brought wealth to the Nguyễn regime. The Portuguese were welcomed to trade in Hội An, but not the Dutch. The Portuguese at Hội An did all they could to prejudice the Southern Vietnamese rulers against the Dutch.

The newly developing local economies, encouraged at first by Japanese and then Fujianese financing, produced goods such as indigenous silk, pepper, sugar, and forest goods. This financing likely took the form of credit advances to be paid off with locally produced materials. The situation was conducive to the petty capitalism that was practiced on China's southeast coast, but without the restraints imposed by the Ming and Qing governments. Fujianese merchants operating along the Vietnam coast were free to develop their enterprises as commodity producers in a more dynamic fashion than in their homeland. The thriving local economies drew more Vietnamese settlers, perhaps following kinship ties, from Đại Việt into the new realm. Much of the southern economy was linked to the flow of international commerce. The Nguyễn even employed Westerners at the court. For example, in 1686 Lord Nguyễn Phúc Tần (r. 1648–87) had Bartholomeu da Costa as his personal doctor. In 1704, lord Nguyễn Phúc Chu (r. 1691–1725) employed Antonio de Arnedo and de Lima in 1724 to teach him mathematics and astronomy. Europeans continued to serve the Nguyễn court until 1820.

=== Early 18th century crisis ===
==== Trịnh North Vietnam ====
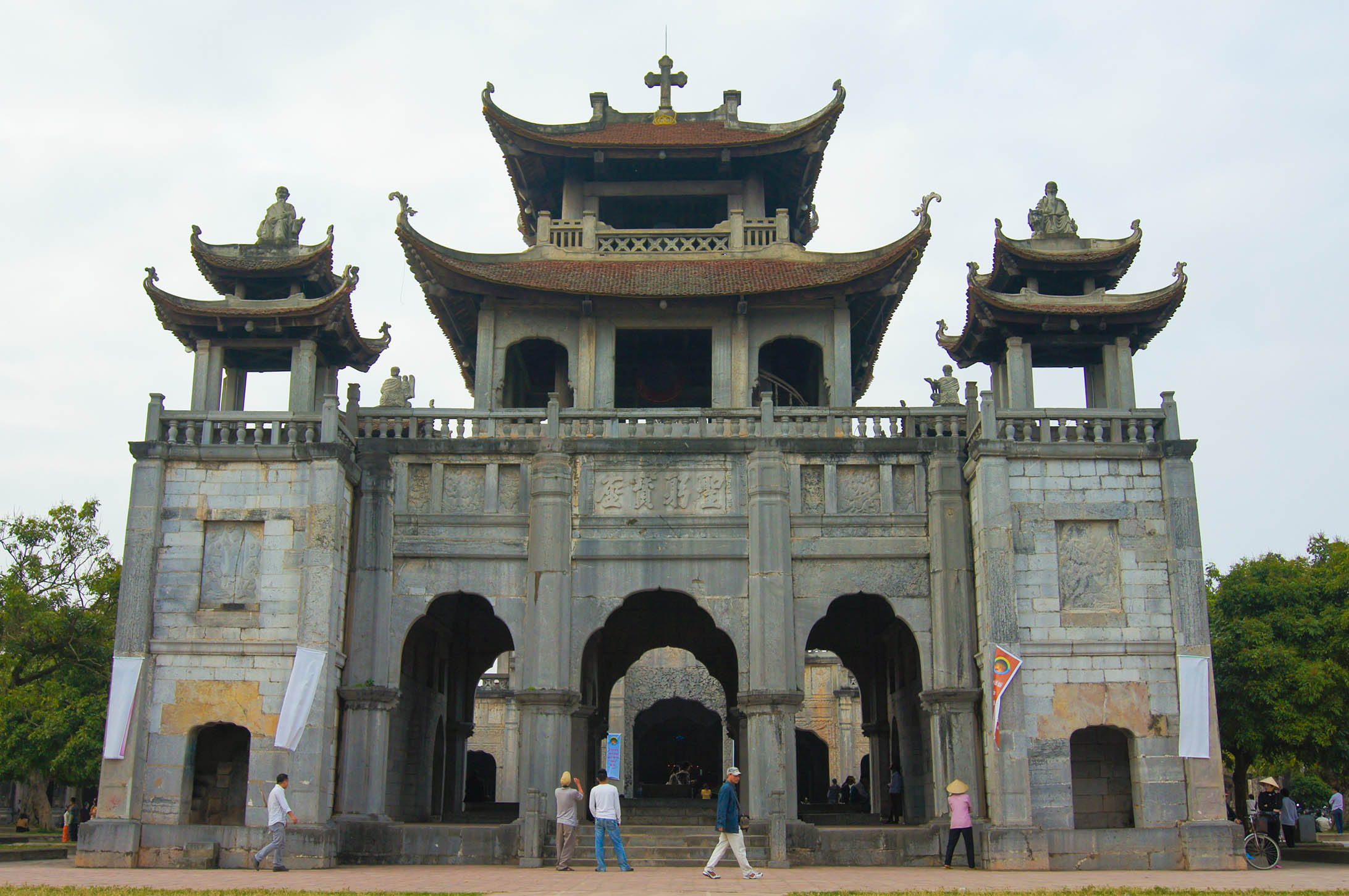
Phát Diệm Cathedral in Ninh Bình, north Vietnam. By the 18th century, there were more than 300,000 Catholic Christians in Vietnam.

In Northern Vietnam, a social crisis began in the early 18th century. The population rose from 4.7 million in 1634 to 6.4 million people in 1730. International trade gradually withered as the English and Dutch closed their counting houses in Thăng Long in 1697 and 1700. In 1694–95, famine struck Sơn Nam, Hải Dương, and Thanh Hóa. In Thanh Hóa in 1702, floodwaters broke through the dikes of the Mã and Chu rivers, contributing to three poor harvests there in the years 1700–1705, which were followed by several years of drought. Then in 1712 and 1713 typhoons and floods swept away tens of thousands of homes and much livestock, causing successive famines in both Thanh Hóa and Đông Kinh. After another famine in 1721, a government attempt to register taxpayers in a canton of Nghệ An caused the flight of much of its able bodied population. That led to registration of the old and weak and an increased burden, so more people left. In 1726–28, suffering in Nghệ An and Thanh Hóa was so extensive that the Trịnh allocated two hundred thousand strings of cash (quan) (Note: each ‘’quan’’ has 600 cash coins.) from the treasury to relieve it. Flooding struck the Red River Delta in 1729, and the next year the populations of 527 northern villages fled their homes. Pestilence spread in 1736. Two years later the Qing annals reported that Chinese had bought a number of fleeing Vietnamese refugees, most likely as slaves.

In 1718 the Trịnh lords began to reorganize taxation by adopting the former Tang dynasty's tripartite system of taxes on land, individuals, and sectors like commerce. The new tripartite fiscal system included taxes on state and private-owned grain-producing land, a tax on adult male individuals rather than a tax quota on the village as a whole, and cash payments in place of a variety of service obligations and handicraft productions. In this way, all agricultural land was meant to be subject to taxation by the government, commerce would provide a share of revenues for the state, and the bureaucracy would gain a better accounting of revenues and expenditures. For the first time, Đại Việt moved in the direction of having a government budget and sought to stabilize the balance of revenues and expenditures. The administration conducted a cadastral survey in 1719 and four years later introduced a tax on private landed property. Privately owned riceland was taxed at a lower rate than public land. Officials, Buddhist pagodas, the capital, and the population of the Thanh Hóa-Nghệ An region (the Trịnh heartland), also gained preferential rates or exemptions, from both the land tax and the head tax. The poor peasantry of the Red River plain continued to bear the heaviest tax burden, and the lands of poor peasants were taken by the rich nobles. The tax on the produce of the soil led to iniquities and was abolished in 1732 for most products, leaving state monopolies on salt, copper, and cinnamon.

Buddhism regained status by gaining royal influence. Trịnh rulers had many temples repaired and new ones built. Lord Trịnh Cương (r. 1709–1729) made frequent pleasure trips to pilgrimage sites and composed poetry about them. From 1713 he forced inhabitants of three districts of Bắc Ninh to work for six years on the restoration of a single temple. In 1719 he feared unrest, abandoned the project, and exempted the districts from a year's taxation. Several years later he resumed the conscription of labor for temple construction. A year after his death, his son Trịnh Giang (r. 1729–40) began a similar project, obliging the people of three districts of Hải Dương to work day and night on two pagodas, digging canals, building roads, and transporting timber and stone. In 1731 he had the emperor Lê Dụ Tông (r. 1709–1729) strangled and a number of courtiers executed. While Trịnh Giang was having other officials investigate the budget, he expended much of it on Buddhist construction, left trusted eunuchs in charge of the court, and allowed local officials to impose exactions on villagers. A series of major rural revolts broke out in the 1730s, one lasting until 1769.

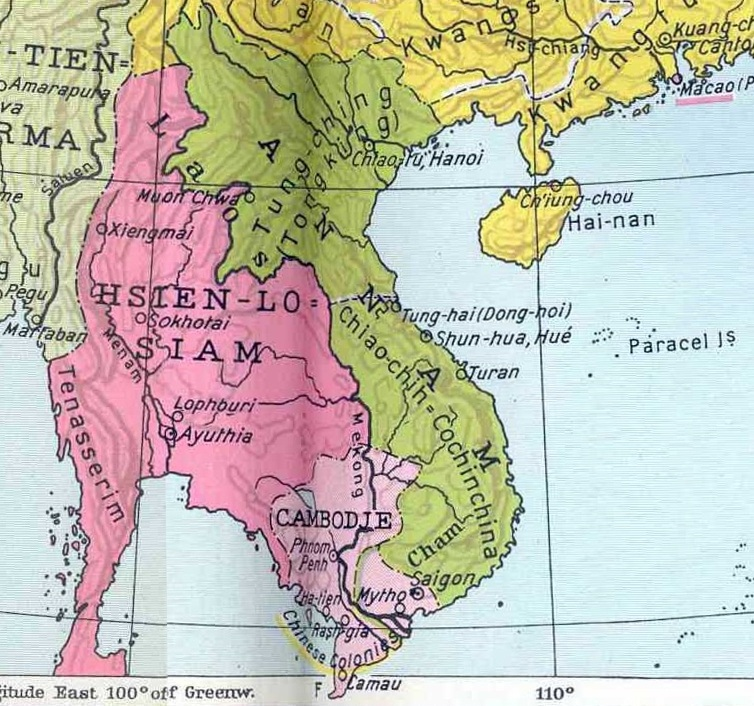
Đại Việt in the 1760s. Trịnh territory is labeled as Tongking, while Nguyễn territory is known as Cochinchina.

Through the mid-18th century, under the rule of Trịnh Doanh (r. 1740–67) these socioeconomic strains contributed to increasing instability across Đại Việt. Local leaders of all types rose in resistance. At court the royal Lê family chafed under the control of their maternal kin, the Trịnh. In 1737, three Lê princes attempted a palace coup. The Trịnh suppressed the effort, and only one prince, Lê Duy Mật (d. 1769), survived by escaping into the Laos hills known to the Vietnamese as Tran Ninh (Plain of Jars), southwest of the capital. Lê Duy Mật resisted for three decades as other rebellions rose and were crushed through the 1740s and 1750s. The Trịnh finally destroyed the prince and his group in 1769. A prominent scholar informed the Trịnh court around 1750 that 1,070 of the 9,668 villages in the Red River Delta were simply gone, along with 297 of Thanh Hóa's 1,392 villages and 115 of the 706 in Nghệ An. 30% of Northern Vietnam's 11,766 villages were empty. As the numbers of adherents of Buddhism and Christianity grew among Vietnamese on all social levels, scholars worked to control their texts and continued to write Chinese-style poetry.

==== Nguyễn South Vietnam ====
Unlike Trịnh's Tonkin, the administrative system of Cochinchina formed part of a complex web of fiscal relations. In the 17th century, Cochinchina's money supply basically derived from external sources, mostly imported from Japan and China, and copper shortages became a major problem in 1688. In the early eighteenth century, the price of copper rose in China, and Japan began to limit its copper exports. While the Trịnh battled agrarian disaster in the north, Nguyễn armies confronted Cambodian resistance to the south. In the Mekong Delta, colonization and competition for resources increasingly plagued relations between local Khmers and Vietnamese. From 1700 to 1772, Southern Vietnamese armies intervened eight times in Cambodia, which was costly. To solve the demand problem for currency, lord Nguyễn Phúc Khoát (r. 1738–65) ordered to the casting of zinc coins worth 72,396 quan (tael, each gold bar costs 150 tael) from 1746 to 1748, though private foundries might have doubled the official numbers. Because zinc was much cheaper and more available in southern Vietnam than copper, this caused massive inflation and a sharp decline in the number of seafaring junks in the next two decades. Robert Kirsop reported in 1750 that after zinc coins were introduced, the price of gold in Hội An rose from 150 to 190 quan per bar to 200–225 quan per bar, while rent costs also increased remarkably. These disastrous economic results undermined the Nguyễn regime. Royal chronicles recorded that there were major famines struck Southern Vietnam in 1752 and 1774.

Year	Number of junks	Revenues through trade (in tael)	Sources
1740s	70	140,000	
1771	16	38,000	
1772	12	14,300	
1773	–	3,200	

In the south, tensions between ethnic Khmer and ethnic Vietnamese turned to violence. A French missionary reported in 1731 that:

“People say that the war originated because of a certain woman who claimed to be the daughter of their god sent to punish the excesses of the Cochinchinese against the Cambodians, magic is mixed up in it and a great deal of prestige. She raised a considerable army of Cambodians. . . .Thus armed and protected by several mandarins [they] marched against the Cochinchinese and made an enormous carnage of them[;] they counted more than ten thousand of them lost as they were not at all ready to oppose her. Thus they ravaged all the provinces of the south of Cochinchina, putting all to fire and blood, killed the great mandarin of the place called Say Gon (Saigon), and burned down the fine church of a Franciscan father. They were not content with this. They killed all those [Vietnamese] that they found in Cambodia, men, women and children.”

Separately, a former Khmer ruler tried to regain his throne with the help of a Vietnamese invading force but was defeated by a Siamese intervention in 1750, and his successor Ang Snguon (r. 1749–55) escalated the violence. Then, in July 1750, the Khmer king launched attacks on every Vietnamese residing in Cambodian territory, including the Mekong delta.

To solve the economic crisis, lord Nguyễn Phúc Thuần raised high taxes on villages in the early 1770s and made efforts to extract revenues from the western mountain areas of the Central Highlands. In a 1769 tax report in Quảng Nam, taxes were sharply increased. Official corruption, the dwindling of foreign trade, and famines combined to bring about a collapse of the tax base. Scholar-officials clearly warned the Nguyễn lord that "the people's misery has reached an extreme degree". As the century progressed, revolts grew in intensity. They might be the primary triggers of the Tây Sơn rebellion that ultimately brought down the Nguyễn clan.

== Rise of the Tây Sơn brothers, 1765–1773 ==
=== Immediate background of the revolt (1765–1771) ===
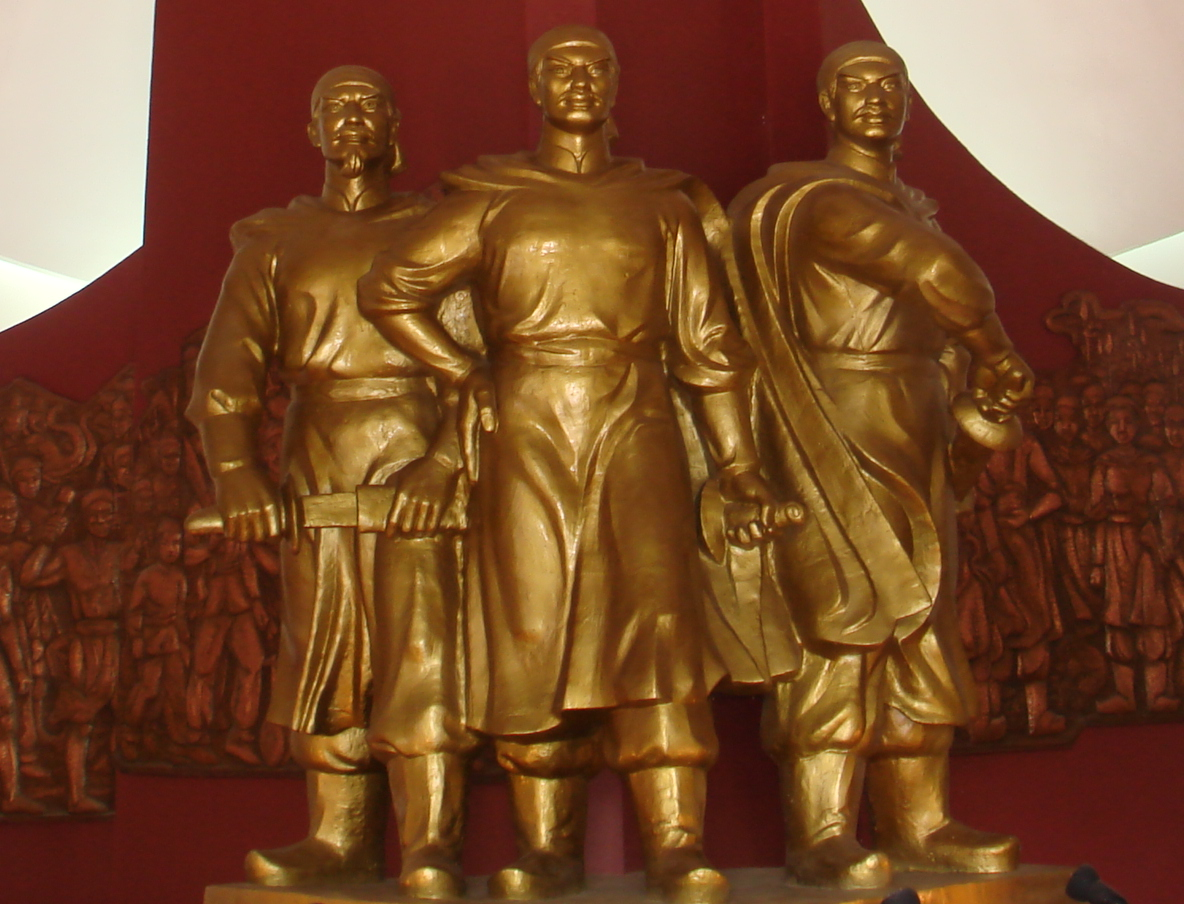
Statues of three Tây Sơn brothers

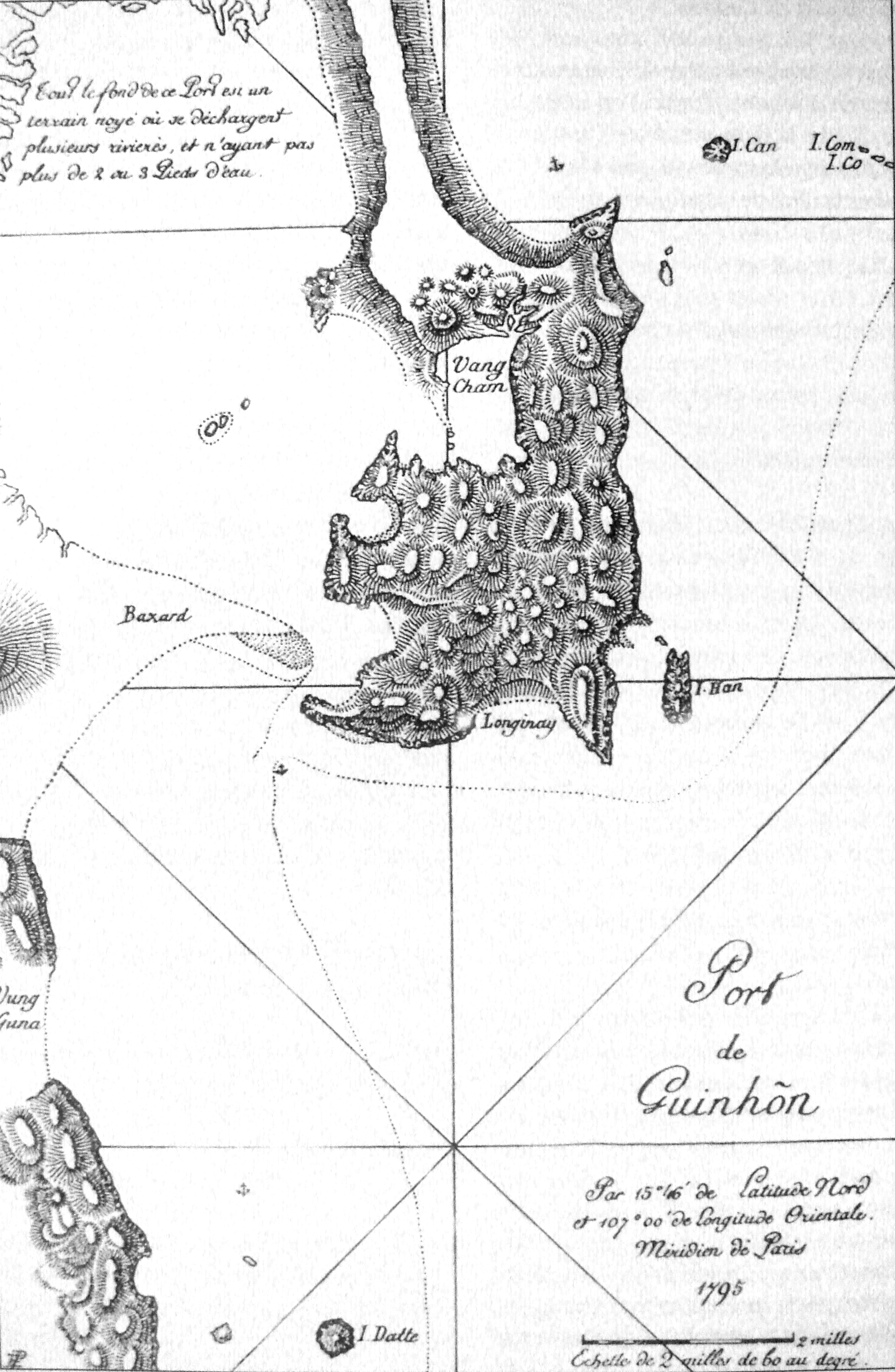
The port of Qui Nhơn by Jean-Marie Dayot (1795)

The Tây Sơn brothers were from the Tây Sơn villages of Bình Định Province and sons of Hồ Phi Phúc, a betel nut trader whose ancestors came from Nghệ An. The eldest brother, Nguyễn Nhạc served as a public clerk ("tuần biên lại") responsible for collecting taxes in the circuit of Vân Đồn (now An Khê, Gia Lai province). Nhạc was also a trader in betel nut, an important local commodity. His second wife was a Bahnar woman who tamed elephants. According to a French merchant named Maurice Durand, Nhạc had never been able to collect taxes in the first place because of the economic woes of the region and popular discontent with tax burdens. One European priest wrote that their father was an apostate Christian and that Nguyễn Nhạc had been baptized as an infant. Another gave Nhạc's baptismal name as Paul and claimed that the Tây Sơn leader called himself "Paul Nhạc". A Vietnamese Jesuit priest, Philiphe Bỉnh, reported not only that the brothers came from a Christian family, but that it was their parents’ religious devotion that had driven them to rebellion. However, these accounts are doubted by historians.

The Nguyễn government of Huế placed heavy tax burdens on the area and its highlands. In 1765, the regent, Trương Phúc Loan (d. 1776), seized power in the Nguyễn capital, which exacerbated the already deteriorating situation. In 1771, Nguyễn Nhạc chose to flee into the Central highlands regions just west of his home rather than risk arrest at the hands of Nguyễn officials who were already looking for him. He took with him his brothers and a small group of supporters, hoping that the remote location would protect them while he planned his next move. He was encouraged in this course of action by his teacher, Trương Văn Hiến, a refugee from the Loan-dominated Nguyễn court. Hiến urged Nhạc to see himself as destined to fulfill a long-standing local prophecy: "tây khởi nghĩa, bắc thu công" (in the west there is a righteous uprising, in the north great feats are accomplished).

=== Uprising (1771–1773) ===
In 1771, Nguyễn Nhạc and his fellows revolted against Trương Phúc Loan's puppet Nguyễn lord. Their movement drew highlanders, Cham people, Vietnamese, and Chinese pirates, all with their own grievances and interests, together to destroy Trương Phúc Loan and his regime. Of these groups, the more important, financially and militarily, were the ethnic Chinese, many of whom were members of the significant coastal trading community. Ethnic Chinese traders, in particular, had grown increasingly unhappy with the downturn in trade and with Nguyễn tax policies, and hoped that the Tây Sơn might provide an improvement.

The region of An Khê to which the Tây Sơn brothers retreated was an ideal location for the rebel leaders as they sought to gain strength and supporters. It was relatively remote, approachable only along a narrow and treacherous route, and easily defended against potential attacks by Nguyễn troops. This highland region straddled important trading routes that stretched from the coastal port at Qui Nhơn westward toward Cambodia and the southern Lao territories, providing access to goods that were carried along them. An Khê was also a resource-rich area that could supply the Tây Sơn with wood, iron, sulphur, horses, and elephants. Nguyễn Nhạc already had numerous contacts in the region who now provided him with shelter and, equally important, recruits for his army. For the next two years, Nhạc and his growing band of followers remained in An Khê working to consolidate their base and attract additional supporters. The strength of their position allowed the brothers to win some early victories in their immediate surroundings, gaining military experience and enhancing their prestige, while risking little. Eventually, Nhạc decided that his army was ready to venture into the lowlands and to challenge the Nguyễn forces directly.

=== Capture of Qui Nhơn (1773) ===
Seeking to establish a foothold in lowland coastal regions of their home province, the Tây Sơn rebels needed to capture the walled city of Qui Nhơn, capital of the prefecture by the same name. Lacking the manpower and the armaments to attack the citadel directly, the Tây Sơn leaders decided to take the city through subterfuge. The device they used was a variation on the Trojan horse, designed to render the citadel vulnerable from the inside. To this end, in mid-September 1773 Nhạc feigned his own capture. He directed his supporters to construct a cage, and when it had been completed he locked himself inside it. These supporters then approached the city officials, announcing that they had captured the notorious Tây Sơn leader, and presented the Nguyễn officials with their ‘‘captive.’’ The officials were delighted at this good fortune, and after suitably rewarding the men who had brought the prize captive, arranged for the cage to be brought into the city. That night, with his supporters gathered outside of the citadel walls, Nhạc released himself from the cage, seized the prison sentry's sword, and began attacking the guards, even as he opened the gates of the city, allowing his soldiers to stream in. Once inside, the Tây Sơn troops made short work of the military contingent posted in the city, setting fire to its barracks. The provincial governor Nguyễn Khắc Tuyên fled the city in such haste that he dropped his seal, the official mark of his right to govern. The seizure of Qui Nhơn with its arms and riches greatly contributed to an expansion of Tây Sơn power and prestige. Taking the city, moreover, gave them effective control over a substantial stretch of coastline. To meet their constant need for labor service, the Tây Sơn rulers greatly expanded the range of groups within society who were subject to such service. This included women and other formerly exempted (or less frequently used) groups in society including children, the elderly, and Buddhist monks.

By 1774, the Tây Sơn rebels grown to more than 25,000 soldiers.

== Wars in 1773–1785 ==
=== Fall of Nguyễn-ruled Cochinchina ===
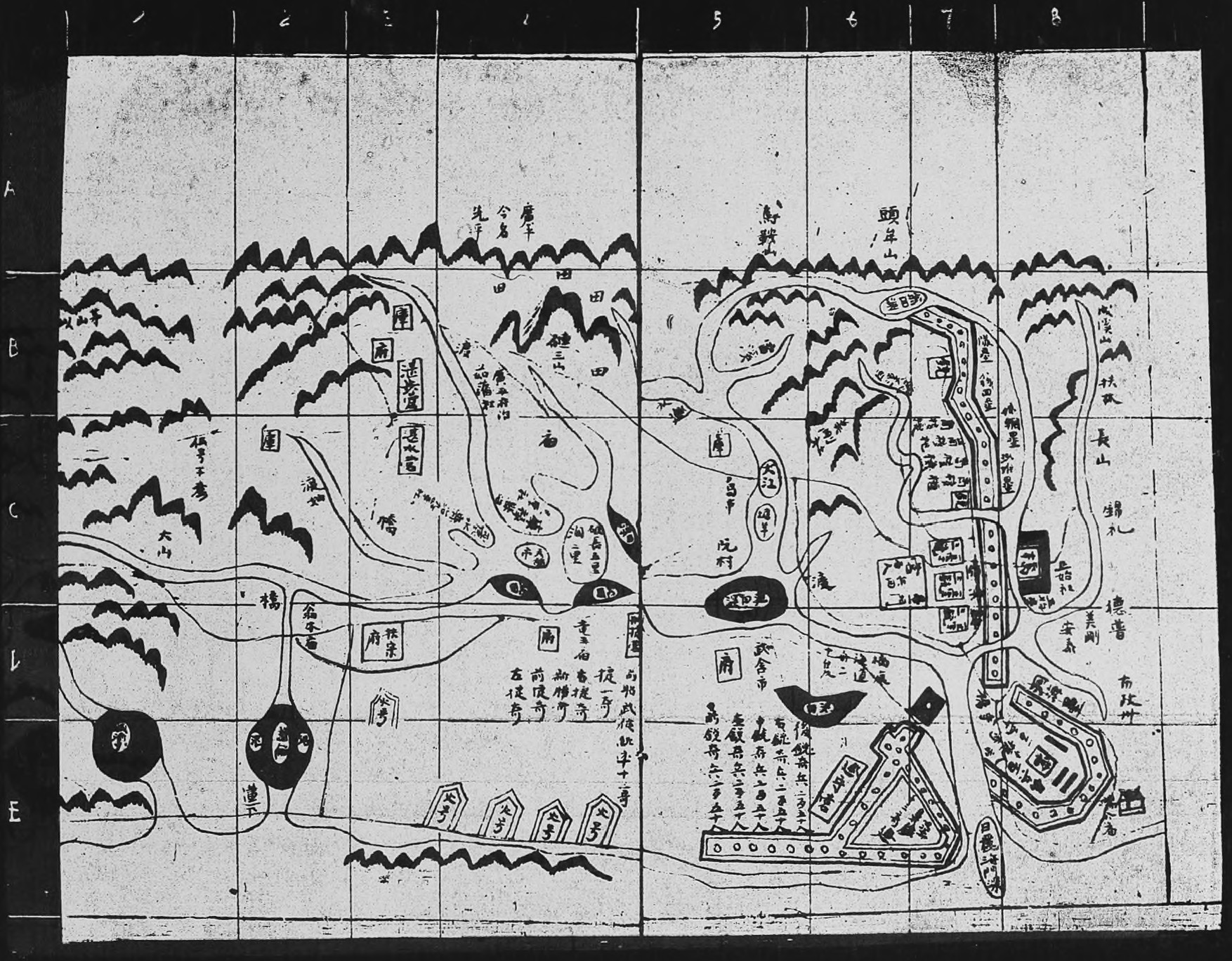
A 1774 Trịnh map of Thuan Hoa-Quang Nam region.

After their victory at Qui Nhơn, Tây Sơn forces were able to seize several adjacent prefectures before encountering some resistance from Nguyễn forces. In the meantime, and taking advantage of the turmoils in South Vietnam, the Trịnh invaded late in 1774, ostensibly to assist the Nguyễn in putting down the Tây Sơn, but clearly seeing a golden opportunity to overpower their long-time political rivals. The young ruler Nguyễn Phúc Thuần (Định Vương) and his nephew, Nguyễn Phúc Ánh, fled by boats to Saigon and the Mekong delta region, which was to serve as the center of its resistance until the end of the Tây Sơn period. The Trịnh forces extended their attack to capture Huế and then crossed the Hải Vân pass, aiming for Tây Sơn positions in northern Quảng Nam. Under pressure from the advancing Trịnh in the north and the Nguyễn in the south, the Tây Sơn leader, Nguyễn Nhạc pragmatically surrendered to the Trịnh in May 1775 and sued for peace. For its part, the Trịnh army turned back and marched north to Huế, where an epidemic almost wiped it out.

Sent south by the Trịnh as an official, the Dong Kinh intellectual Lê Quý Đôn left a description of the wealth discovered by the Trịnh forces at Huế in the form of the many thousands of strings of imported cash produced abroad for the Nguyễn regime.

=== Tây Sơn campaigns in Saigon ===
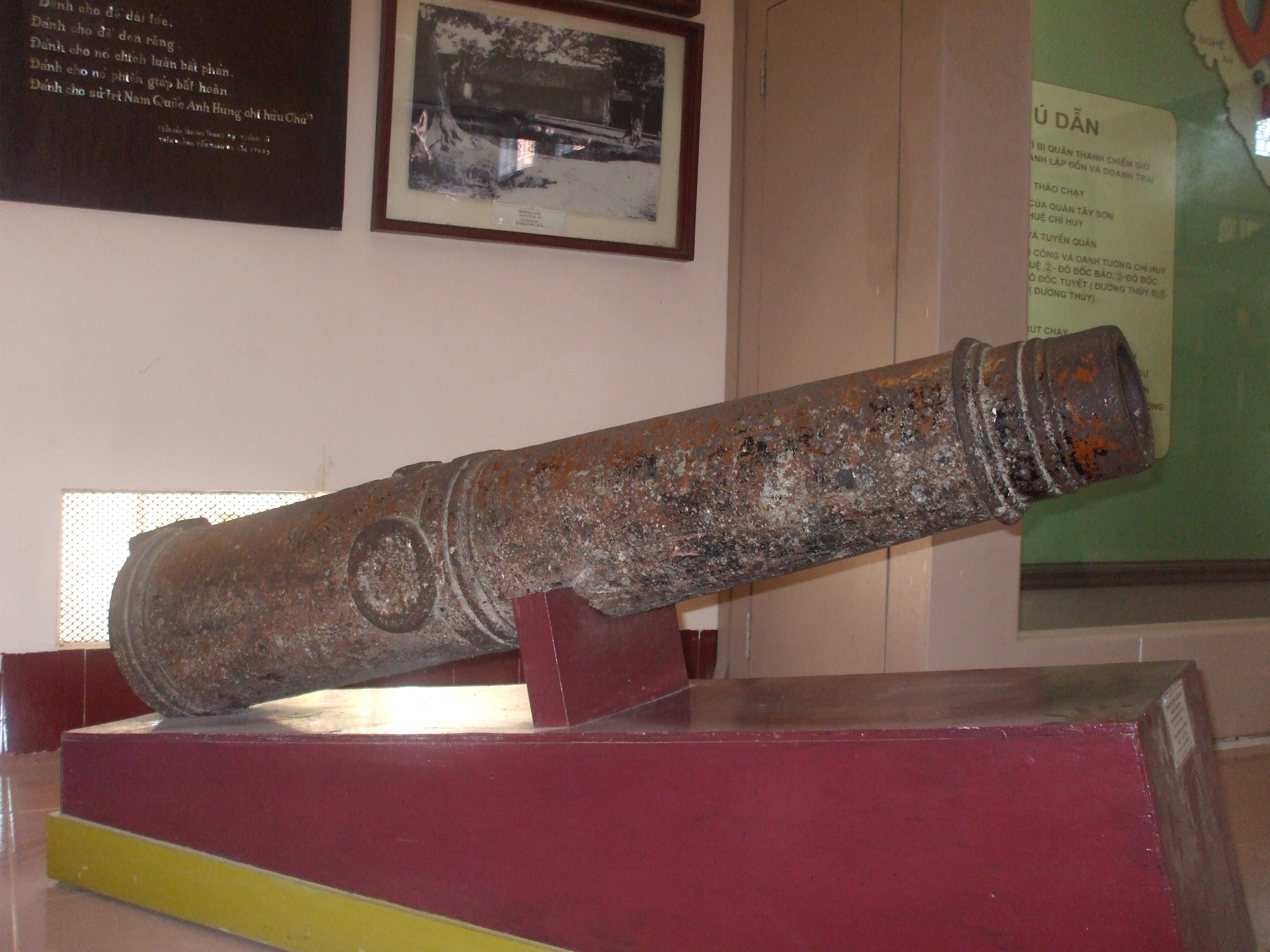
Tây Sơn cannon

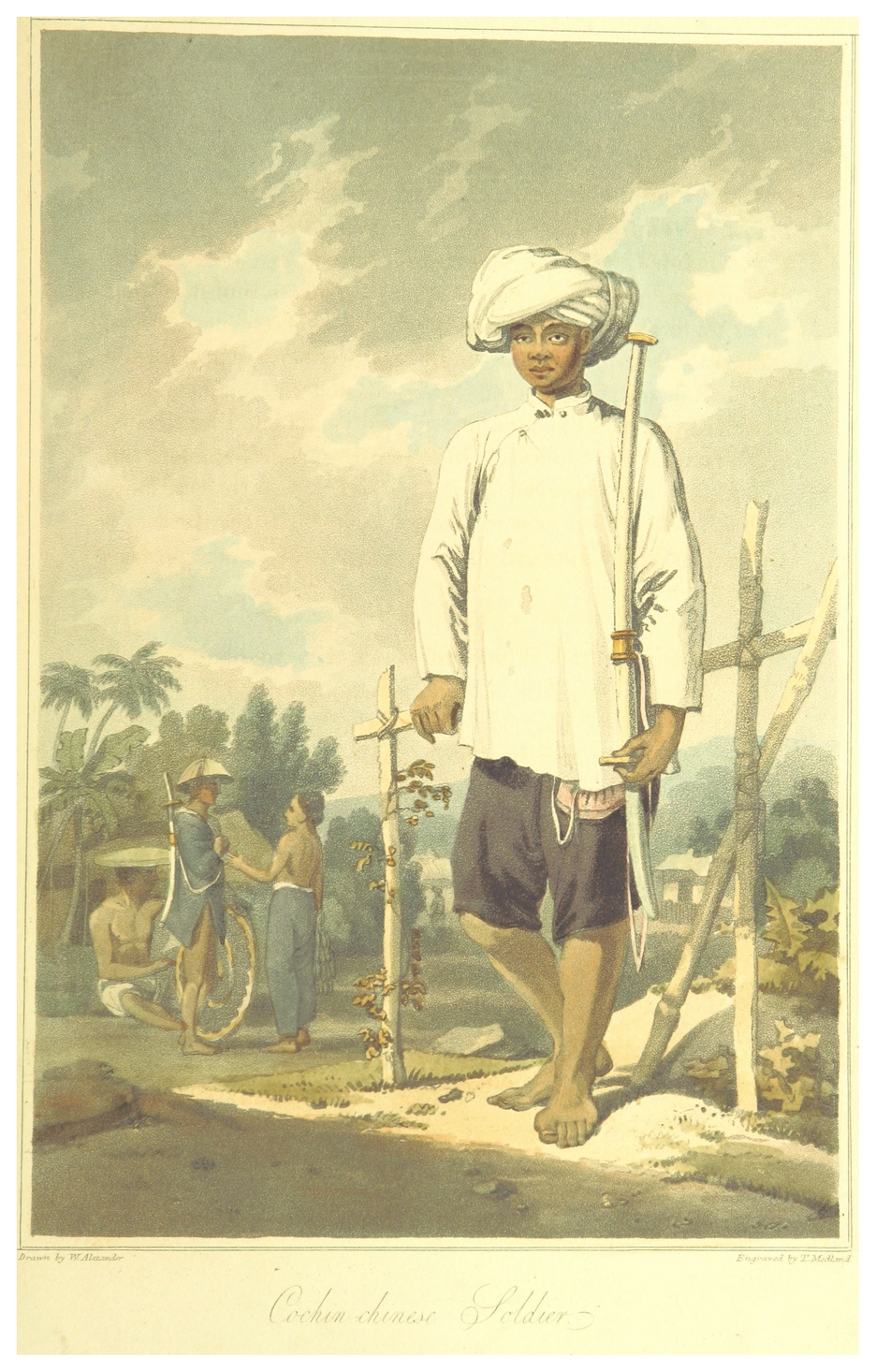
A soldier of the Tây Sơn dynasty in 1793

The next ten years were marked by a series of back and forth military campaigns between the Tây Sơn and Nguyễn forces. The focal point of this contest was Gia Định Province and its strategic city of Saigon. The rhythms of the war were dictated to a considerable degree by the monsoon winds, which permitted the large-scale movement of naval forces only in certain directions and at certain times. The form of the contest was also shaped by the considerable ambivalence of the Tây Sơn brothers about carrying out extended military campaigns at any distance from their base. It is clear that they always felt more comfortable in and around Qui Nhơn and were reluctant to remain far afield for any length of time. Thus, while they frequently captured Gia Định, the brothers were unwilling to oversee the occupation of that region themselves. Instead, they would quickly return to their fortress at Qui Nhơn before the winds turned against them. Each time they would leave behind an occupation force whose strength appeared sapped by the absence of its primary leaders, leaving the area vulnerable to a concerted Nguyễn counterattack.

Local ethnic Vietnamese merchants from Qui Nhơn and other south-central ports were among the other early supporters of the rebellion. They have resented competition from the ethnic Chinese merchants who were by now well established in the southern ports of Gia Định and Hà Tiên and whose trading houses penetrated the Mekong delta and prospered on its burgeoning rice exports. It is known that in 1775, two-thirds of the Tây Sơn army was commanded by Lý Tài and Tập Định, who were ethnic Chinese. The ethnic Chinese forces dramatically expanded the size of the Tây Sơn force, even as their presence eroded the fragile unity of the rebel army. The Chinese troops were organized as autonomous military forces answerable only to their Chinese commanders, who were allies of, rather than generals in, the Tây Sơn army. Moreover, it appears that the Chinese commitment to the Tây Sơn was limited, and within two years the leaders of these autonomous armies had broken ranks with the original core of Tây Sơn supporters. When, soon after, Tập Định was removed from position by Nguyễn Nhạc, Lý Tài and his Chinese "Hoà Nghĩa" army left the Tây Sơn rebels and defected to the Nguyễn forces in late 1775. Lý Tài's Chinese forces soon became a rival force in the eyes of Đỗ Thanh Nhơn (a powerful Nguyễn general) within the Nguyễn army. Lý Tài recruited Chinese settlers in the Mekong delta, the Minh Hương, strengthening his army to 8,000 men. The Hoà Nghĩa army was divided into four banners, yellow, red, blue and white. Unlike other Nguyễn army bases in rural areas, the Hoà Nghĩa military group was based in urban areas of Saigon where Chinese settlers were concentrated, providing him Chinese material, manpower and finance assistance.

The Tây Sơn forces captured Saigon for the first time in mid-spring of 1776 as the youngest brother, Nguyễn Lữ, led a naval attack up the Saigon River. Shortly thereafter, however, the Nguyễn forces returned, recaptured the city, and forced Lữ to retreat to Qui Nhơn. In mid spring of 1777, Nguyễn Nhạc sent Lữ and the youngest brother, Nguyễn Huệ to recapture Saigon. The Tây Sơn under Huệ destroyed the majority of the Nguyễn armed forces and captured and then killed nearly every member of the Nguyễn royal family, including the last Nguyễn lord. They also defeated the Hoà Nghĩa, and Lý Tài was killed by Đỗ Thanh Nhơn's forces. Having completed his task, Huệ returned to Qui Nhơn, leaving a body of troops behind to retain control of the city.

In 1778, Nguyễn Nhạc proclaimed himself "Heavenly King" (thiên vương) in a ceremony held in the citadel of the former Cham capital, Chà Bàn (Vijaya), near Qui Nhơn, taking the regnal name Thái Đức and choose the citadel of Chà Bàn as his capital. The Trịnh recognized Nhạc the next year but accorded him only the rank of "Grand Duke" of Quảng Nam. Through his adoption of a new regnal title, Nhạc was declaring the establishment of an independent southern state, rather than challenging the Lê emperor's claims to authority over all of Đại Việt. When detailing his plans for further territorial conquests to the British envoy Charles Chapman in the same year, Nhạc spoke only of conquering the former Nguyễn territories at that time under Trịnh control, making no mention of challenging Lê authority north of the Gianh River.

=== Nguyễn remnants in South Vietnam ===
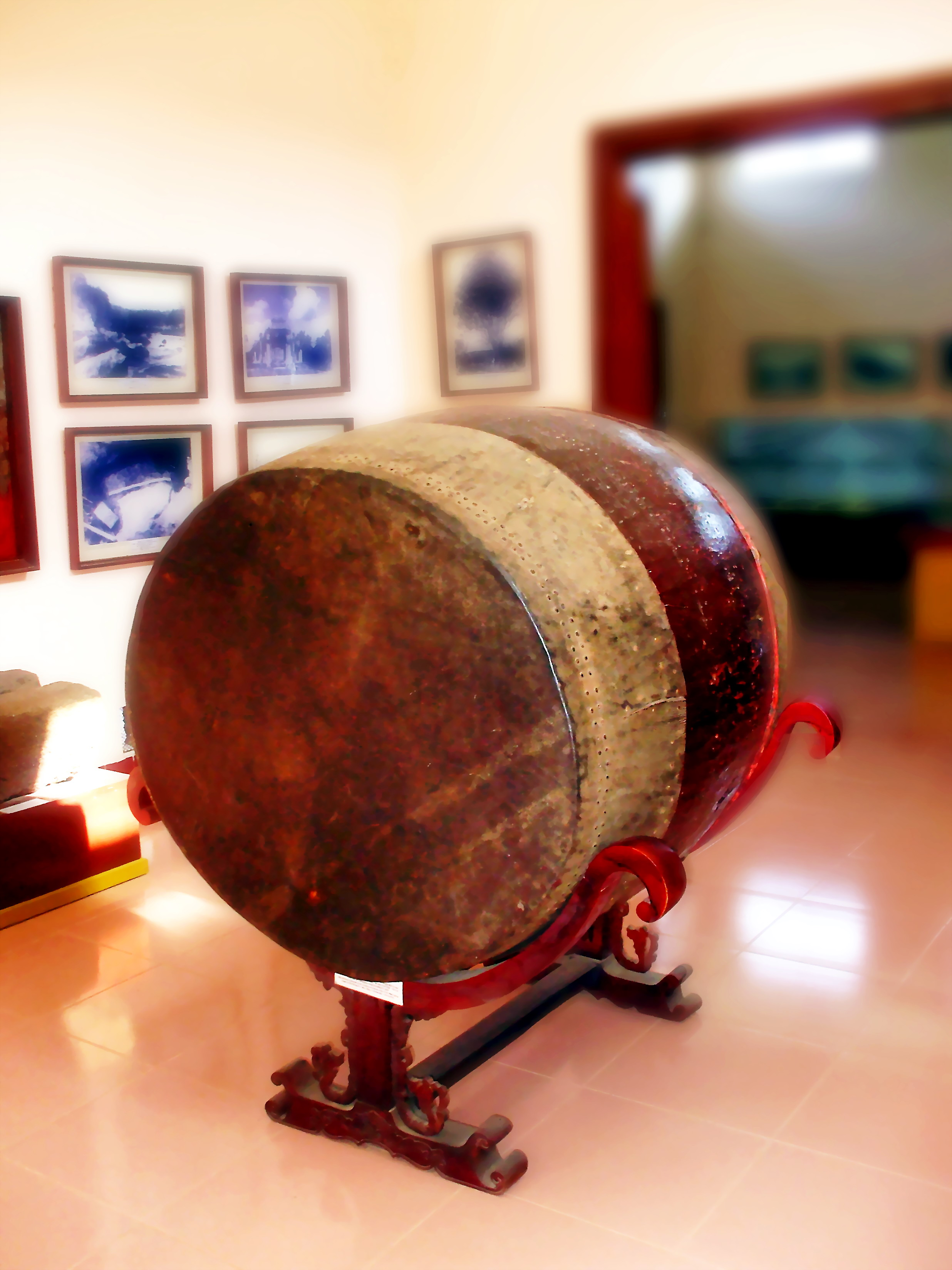
A war drum of the Tây Sơn rebels

The sole survivor of the Tây Sơn massacre of the Nguyễn royal family was prince Nguyễn Phúc Ánh (1761–1820). Nguyễn Ánh was sheltered by the Catholic priest Paul Nghi (Phaolô Hồ Văn Nghị) in Rạch Giá. Later, he fled to Hà Tiên on the southern coastal tip of Vietnam, where he met Pigneau de Behaine, a French priest who became his adviser and played a major part in his rise to power. Receiving information from Paul Nghi, Pigneau avoided the Tây Sơn army in Cambodia and came back to assist Nguyễn Ánh. They hid in the forest in the swamps of Cà Mau at the southern tip of Vietnam to avoid the pursuit of the Tây Sơn army before finding refuge on the island of Pulau Panjang in the Gulf of Siam. On hearing news of the Tây Sơn withdraw from Gia Định, he regrouped his remaining forces and advanced from the west via Long Xuyên and Sa Đéc, reentering the region in triumph in early 1778.

With the support of the Đông Sơn army (a local Nguyễn-supporting military group), Nguyễn Ánh proclaimed himself king (vương), ascended the throne in 1780, eliminated the powerful general Đỗ Thanh Nhơn, then acquired the power of the Đông Sơn army and gained direct contact with the people of Gia Định. The removal of the anti-Chinese general Đỗ Thanh Nhân allowed Chinese settlers to take part in Nguyễn Ánh's struggles. This marked the beginning of a longer-term occupation of Gia Định, and the young Nguyễn prince used the opportunity to bolster his (still questionable) authority. He sent an embassy to Siam hoping to reach agreement on a treaty of friendship, which would help to reinforce his legitimacy in preparation for a campaign to retake the rest of the country from the Tây Sơn. To alleviate their desperate supply situation, between 1777 and 1789 Nguyễn Ánh sent his officials on diplomatic missions to Cambodia, Siam, India, France, and Melaka.

From early 1778 until 1781 neither side sought to challenge the status quo, as both parties were busy consolidating their respective positions. Then, in the summer of 1781, hostilities broke out again as Nguyễn Ánh launched an unsuccessful attack against the Tây Sơn coastal stronghold at Nha Trang. This was followed in May 1782 by a Tây Sơn counterattack led by Nguyễn Nhạc and Nguyễn Huệ. The two brothers assembled 100 warships and moved south, forcing their way up the Saigon River to launch an assault against the citadel at Gia Định. The Chinese Hoà Nghĩa army under Nguyễn Ánh again engaged with Tây Sơn rebels.

Having succeeded in fighting their way into the city, however, one of Nhạc's key lieutenants was killed by an ethnic Chinese general fighting for the Nguyễn. Nhạc decided to clean out Chinese settlers in Saigon. Tây Sơn troops burned and pillaged the shops of Chinese merchants and massacred thousands of Chinese residents. This was more generally reflected by Tây Sơn's anger at the increasing support given by the Chinese community to their Nguyễn rivals. After this savage victory, the Tây Sơn leaders returned north in June, leaving the city in the hands of their lieutenants. Hearing that Huệ and Nhạc had left the city, Nguyễn Ánh counterattacked, recapturing the city a few months later.

=== Relationship of Nguyễn Anh and the French and Siamese invasion of 1785 ===
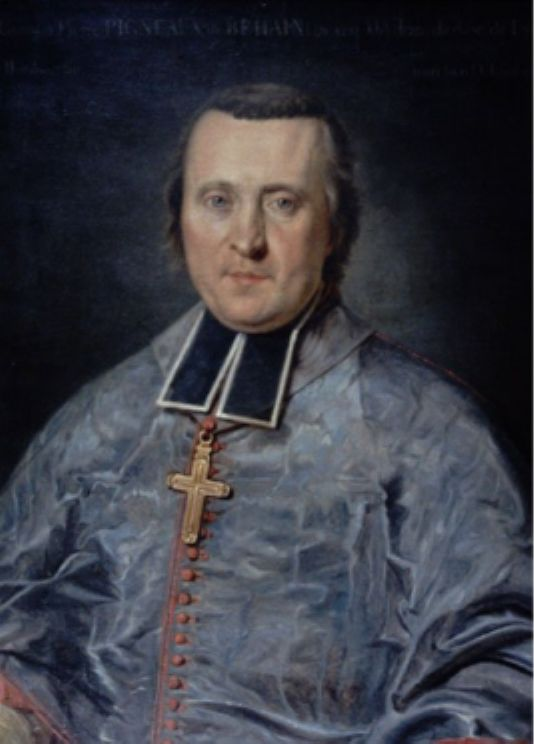
Portrait of Pigneau de Behaine

The French first intervened in Vietnam in 1777 when Nguyễn Ánh, fleeing from an offensive of the Tây Sơn, received shelter from Pigneau de Behaine in the southern Principality of Hà Tiên. Pigneau de Behaine and his Catholic community in Hà Tiên then helped Nguyễn Ánh take refuge in the island of Pulo Panjang. When a pro-Nguyễn coup in Cambodian court toppled King Ang Non II in 1780, Nguyễn Ánh's army intervened and Pigneau helped them obtain weapons, especially grenades and three Portuguese vessels. Contemporary witnesses clearly describe Pigneau's military role:

”Bishop Pierre Joseph Georges, of French nationality, has been chosen to deal with certain matters of war” — J. da Fonceca e Sylva, 1781.

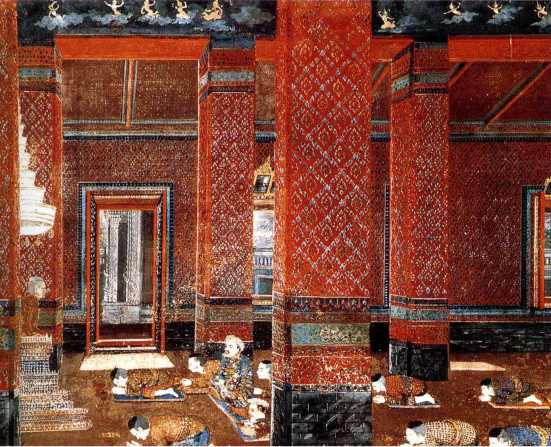
A painting of Nguyễn Ánh (or Ong Chiang Sue in Thai) in audience with King Rama I in the Amarin Throne Hall in Bangkok 1782.

The major Siamese invasion of Cambodia threatened to end Nguyễn rule there, but in 1781 the Siamese commander received news of trouble in the court at home. He offered a truce, marched his army back to Siam, and seized power. He took the Siamese throne as King Rama I, founding the Chakri dynasty in Bangkok in 1782. In March 1783, Huệ and Lữ once again attacked Saigon, and again destroyed the Nguyễn army and chased off Nguyễn Ánh. Seeking to extend their triumph, the Tây Sơn commanders sent a fleet to chase after Nguyễn Ánh and his largely demoralized troops. A huge storm at sea, however, destroyed much of the Tây Sơn navy, allowing Nguyễn Ánh to escape to Phú Quốc Island, where his men were reduced to eating grasses and bananas. Pigneau de Behaine visited the Siamese court in Bangkok at the end 1783. Nguyễn Ánh also reached Bangkok in February 1784, where he obtained that an army would accompany him back to Vietnam.

Nguyễn Ánh was given shelter by the Siamese king and plotted his next move, which came in January 1785. Starting from his base in Siam, and backed by an additional twenty thousand soldiers and three hundred ships contributed by the Siamese ruler, Ánh and his army moved by foot across Cambodia and by sea through the Gulf of Siam in an attack on the southern Vietnamese provinces. The Tây Sơn were ready for the Siamese-Nguyễn attack, waiting in ambush along a stretch of the Mekong River near Mỹ Tho. Nguyễn Huệ lured the overconfident Siamese navy into his trap, destroying all of the Siamese ships and leaving a thousand of the Siamese troops surviving. The loss was devastating for the Nguyễn forces, who joined the remains of the Siamese army in fleeing back to their refuge in Bangkok. Nguyễn Ánh again took refuge with the Siamese court, and again tried to obtain help from the Siamese. Nguyễn Ánh also resolved to obtain any help he could from Western powers.

== Tây Sơn conquest of Tonkin, 1785–1788 ==
=== Fall of the Trịnh Lord ===
Having decisively defeated Nguyễn Ánh, Nguyễn Nhạc saw an opportunity to realize a long-held ambition to expand his power into the former Nguyễn territories between the Hải Vân pass and the Gianh River that were still being occupied by the Trịnh. The timing could not have been better, as the Trịnh grip on power had been substantially weakened by a series of famines and floods in the 1770s that had forced many people to leave their villages in search of food. Furthermore, the death of Trịnh Sâm in 1782 had been followed by political infighting resulting in a palace coup. This had created political instability and the emergence of a renegade militia only loosely controlled by the new ruling faction. Finally, Nhạc's decision to go north was driven by strong encouragement from a prominent Trịnh defector, Nguyễn Hữu Chỉnh. Forced to flee Tonkin in the aftermath of the 1782 coup, Chỉnh had joined the Tây Sơn as a military leader and strategist. Over the next four years he had actively cultivated Nhạc's interest in going north, hoping that such an expedition would provide an opportunity to exact revenge on those who had forced him into political exile.

On Chỉnh's advice, Nguyễn Nhạc sent an expedition north toward Huế in June 1786. The Tây Sơn army was led by Nguyễn Huệ and Chỉnh, with Huệ commanding a naval force that sailed up the coast and then entered the Hương River and Chỉnh leading an overland attack across the Hải Vân pass. After brief resistance, the city surrendered to the Tây Sơn army, who then slaughtered many of its Trịnh defenders. Shortly thereafter, surrounding areas also submitted to the Tây Sơn force, and in a matter of days all of Thuận Hoá as far as the Gianh River had fallen into Tây Sơn hands. Huệ's orders from his brother had been to stop at the traditional Nguyễn-Trịnh boundary (that is, the Gianh River), but on urging from Chỉnh, Huệ decided to use his momentum to press the attack and seize the rest of the Trịnh territories. Huệ and Chỉnh attacked northward with four hundred ships, seizing public rice granaries as they went. Chỉnh's troops passed through Nghệ An and Thanh Hoá without meeting any sustained resistance. Soon afterward, panic struck the capital Thăng Long, and the northern ruler Trịnh Khải fled to Sơn Tây, where he was captured and committed suicide, ending more than two centuries of rule by Trịnh lords. His death, and the general collapse of Trịnh resistance, left the road to the capital wide open, and Nguyễn Huệ's armies marched into Thăng Long on July 21, 1786. Terrifying the northern literati, Huệ's assault from the south earned him the nickname “Chế Bồng Nga”.

Entering the capital, the victorious rebels opened official granaries and distributed food to the people. Once in the capital, Huệ held a solemn audience with the aged Cảnh Hưng Emperor (Lê Hiển Tông) (r. 1740–1786) during which Huệ offered his submission and presented army and population registers to the emperor as well as a document proclaiming that the Lê dynasty had been restored to its rightful authority. The emperor, in return, gave Huệ the position of general and the title of grand duke as well as the hand of a Lê princess (Lê Ngọc Hân) in marriage. Cảnh Hưng died a few days later and was succeeded by his nephew, Lê Chiêu Thống (r. 1786–1789). A few days later, toward the end of August, the Tây Sơn brothers returned south with their armies, leaving behind their erstwhile ally Nguyễn Hữu Chỉnh. Forced to fend for himself, and unsure of his stature in north Vietnam, Chỉnh chose to retreat from the northern capital and to develop a base in Nghệ An.

=== Civil war between three brothers in 1787 ===
After returning south, Nguyễn Nhạc divided the newly expanded territory among the three brothers. The weakest brother, Nguyễn Lữ, was assigned to rule over the Saigon and the Mekong Delta region as the Đông Định Vương (Eastern Stabilization King). Nhạc took the central region for himself, continuing to rule as Emperor Thái Đức at his imperial citadel near Qui Nhơn. Nguyễn Huệ, situated at Huế, was anointed as the Bắc Bình Vương (Northern Pacification King) and was assigned to rule the recently captured area of Thuận Hoá, along with the region of Nghệ An, which he had pried away from the Lê family. The divisions between the brothers were not merely geographical, but also personal. These tensions, stemming from Nhạc's concern about Huệ's increasing autonomy, boiled over into a violent internecine struggle that lasted from late February to mid-June 1787. Huệ quickly assembled an army of 50,000 peasants. The conflict culminated in Huệ's besieging his older brother at Chà Bàn and winning a decisive victory after which he forced Nhạc to surrender additional territory south of the Hải Vân pass. In the same year, Nguyễn Huệ was conscripting fifteen-year-olds into his army because much of his previous soldiers had abandoned him due his reported "cruelty", which left them dying of hunger.

=== Unrest in northern Vietnam (1786–1788) ===
In the north meanwhile, the Chiêu Thống Emperor proved a weak ruler, easily manipulated by more powerful politicians. His weakness prompted survivors of the Trịnh family to stage a comeback, and they were soon able to reimpose their family's traditional influence over the court. The emperor secretly communicated news of this situation to Nguyễn Hữu Chỉnh. Seeing an opportunity to enhance his own power, Chỉnh gathered a 10,000-man army and marched toward Thăng Long in December 1786. By late January he had defeated the Trịnh army and effectively established himself as the new master of the north. Huệ, angered at Chỉnh's unauthorized actions, ordered him to return, but Chỉnh refused. Supremely confident in his strength, and probably still convinced of continuing divisions among the Tây Sơn leaders, Chỉnh also counseled Chiêu Thống to demand the return of Nghệ A from Nguyễn Huệ. Huệ angrily rebuffed the Lê ruler's request, instead ordering his aide Võ Văn Nhậm to take a body of troops to Thăng Long to seize Chỉnh. Nhậm moved north in the fall of 1787, easily taking the capital, quickly abandoned by the Lê royal, and capturing and then killing Chỉnh. But then Nhậm was seemingly seduced by the same ambitions that had stirred Chỉnh and, seeing no obstacles in his path, took power for himself. Ngô Văn Sở, the Tây Sơn general in the north, despised Nhậm and sent a secret message to Huệ stating that Nhậm was planning to betray him. Huệ trusted Sở and decided to launch another attack on Thăng Long in the spring of 1788, capturing and then beheading Nhậm.

== Qing invasion of northern Vietnam ==
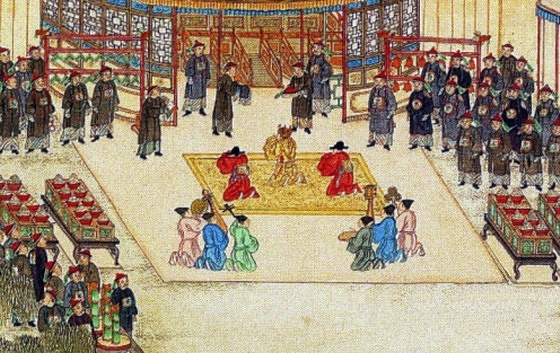
Chinese officials receiving deposed Vietnamese emperor Lê Chiêu Thống

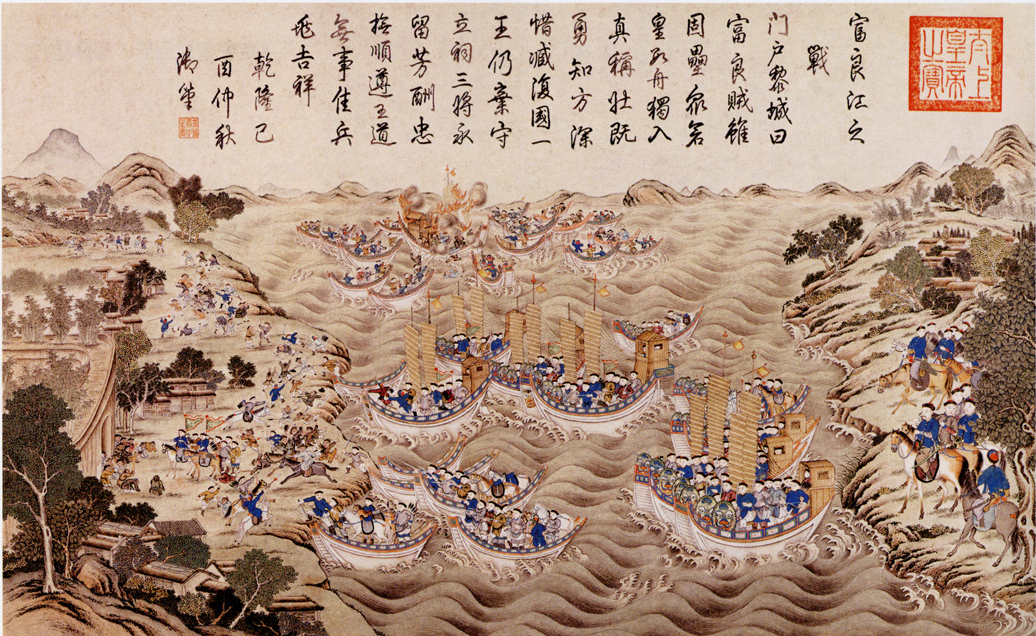
Chinese troops battling with Vietnamese Tây Sơn forces in late 1788

Having fled his capital during the second Tây Sơn invasion of north Vietnam in 1787, the Lê emperor Chiêu Thống invoked the tributary connections with the Qing emperor and requested his government's aid. Although the Qianlong Emperor of the Qing was hesitant to become involved in what looked like an internal Vietnamese affair, Sun Shiyi, the ambitious Qing governor for the southern Chinese provinces of Guangdong and Guangxi, convinced him that the invasion would be a simple matter. In late October 1788, Qianlong sent an army of up to two hundred thousand, which crossed into northern Vietnam, occupied Thăng Long (Hanoi) without meeting resistance, and briefly restored the Lê dynasty.

Outnumbered, the Tây Sơn forces under Ngô Văn Sở retreated to Thanh Hoá, where they sent a message to Nguyễn Huệ in Huế asking for reinforcements. Huệ decided that the Lê family had lost their mandate to the throne. In retaliation, Huệ had himself crowned Emperor Quang Trung (r. 1788– 1792) in Huế. The newly crowned Tây Sơn emperor immediately assembled another army and proceeded northward. He also sent an envoy with a petition to the Qing general, requesting that he withdraw his troops. The Qing general's reply was to tear up the petition and execute the envoy. Meanwhile, the Qing troops were busy celebrating the lunar New Year, with no thought to their enemy. Nguyễn Huệ had ordered his troops to celebrate the New Year early. After performing their rituals for the New Year (Tet) early, Tây Sơn forces on New Year's Day 1789 launched the first Tet offensive with 100,000 men and 100 war elephants. In a stroke akin to George Washington crossing the Delaware on Christmas night some twelve years earlier, they attacked the Qing troops who were in the midst of their own New Year's celebrations in Thăng Long for midnight of the fifth day of the holiday celebration. The Vietnamese attack caught the Qing forces completely unprepared, and the Qing army was easily defeated as its troops and their commanders fled in disarray. Thousands of fleeing Qing troops drowned after they crowded onto a bridge that collapsed into the Red River, and survivors retreated north with the Lê royal heir. A contemporary missionary letter described the situation:

”The Emperor of China appears to fear this new Attila, as he has sent to crown him the king of Tonkin by the hand of an Ambassador, it being only a few months later, and forgetting the honor and loss of more than 40 or 50,000 men whom the tyrant killed the previous year in a single battle, in which the Chinese were armed to the teeth with sabers and guns, and outnumbered them ten to one. It is true that this embassy is, in everyone's eyes, so unbelievable that one doubts with some justification that which the Emperor has done. The tyrant himself has not designed to leave Cochinchina to have himself crowned at our capital, and he has contented himself with sending in his place a simple officer, who took the dress and name of his master and imposed himself on the Ambassador.”

Meanwhile, when the Tây Sơn were campaigning against the Qing in the north, Nguyễn Ánh and his Siamese allies under Rama I retook Saigon and the Mekong Delta in late 1788. He had easily driven out Nguyễn Lữ, who had been forced to flee to Qui Nhơn, where he died a short while later.

== Quang Trung in power, 1789–1792 ==
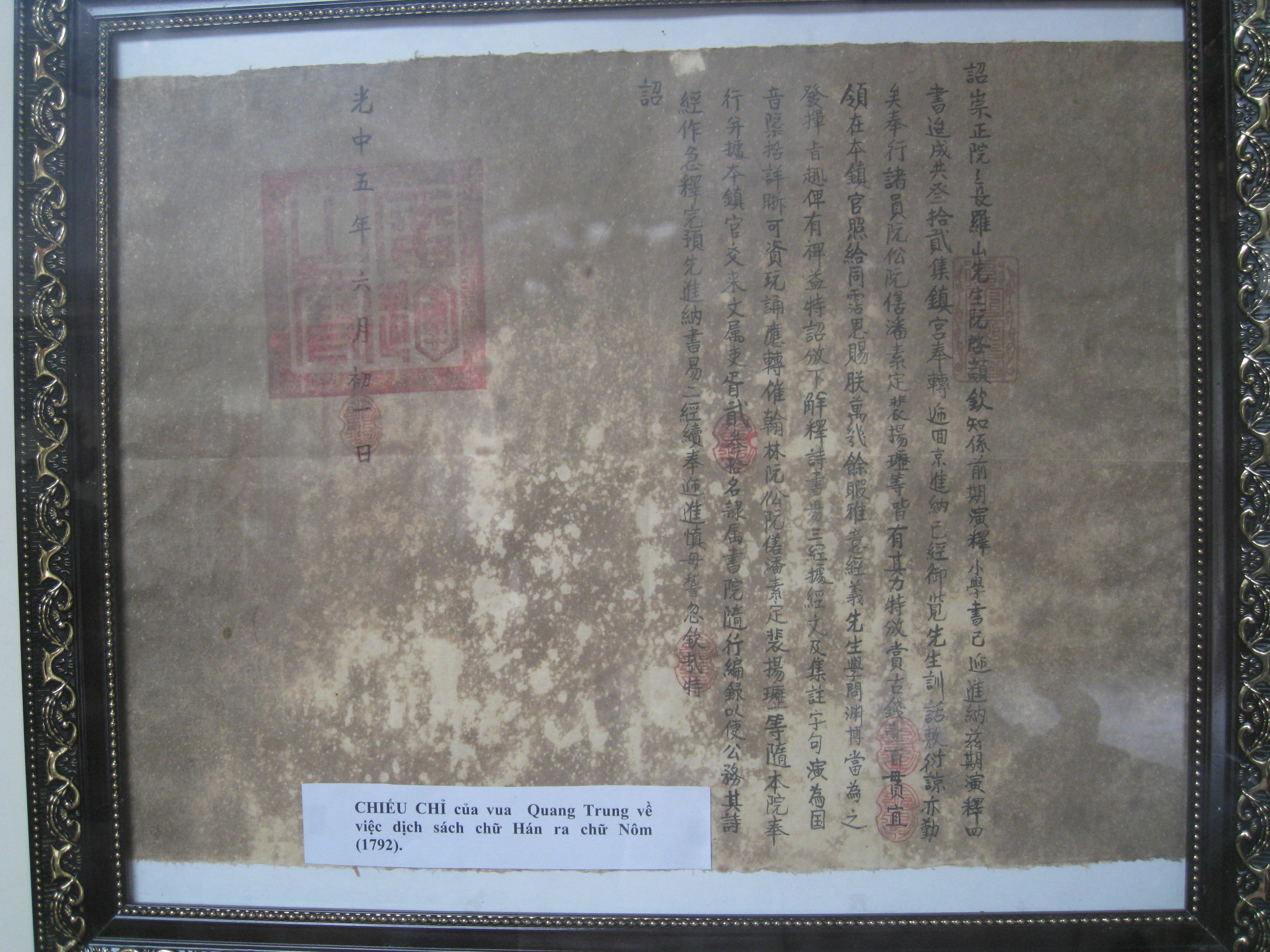
A royal edict of Quang Trung in 1790 on translating classical Chinese texts into Vietnamese script

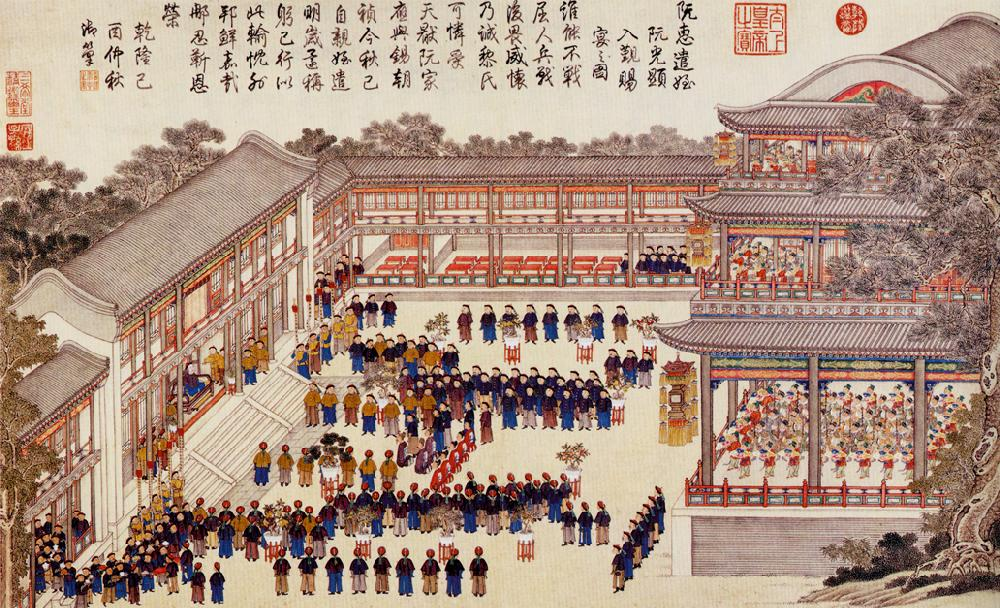
Late 18th-century painting depicting the Qianlong Emperor receiving Nguyễn Quang Hiển, the peace envoy from Nguyễn Hue in Beijing

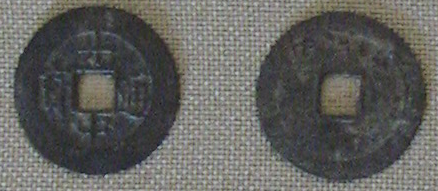
Quang Trung Thông Bảo (光中通寶), a coin issued during the reign of Emperor Quang Trung

A Voyage to Cochin China, in the years 1792, and 1793 by George Macartney

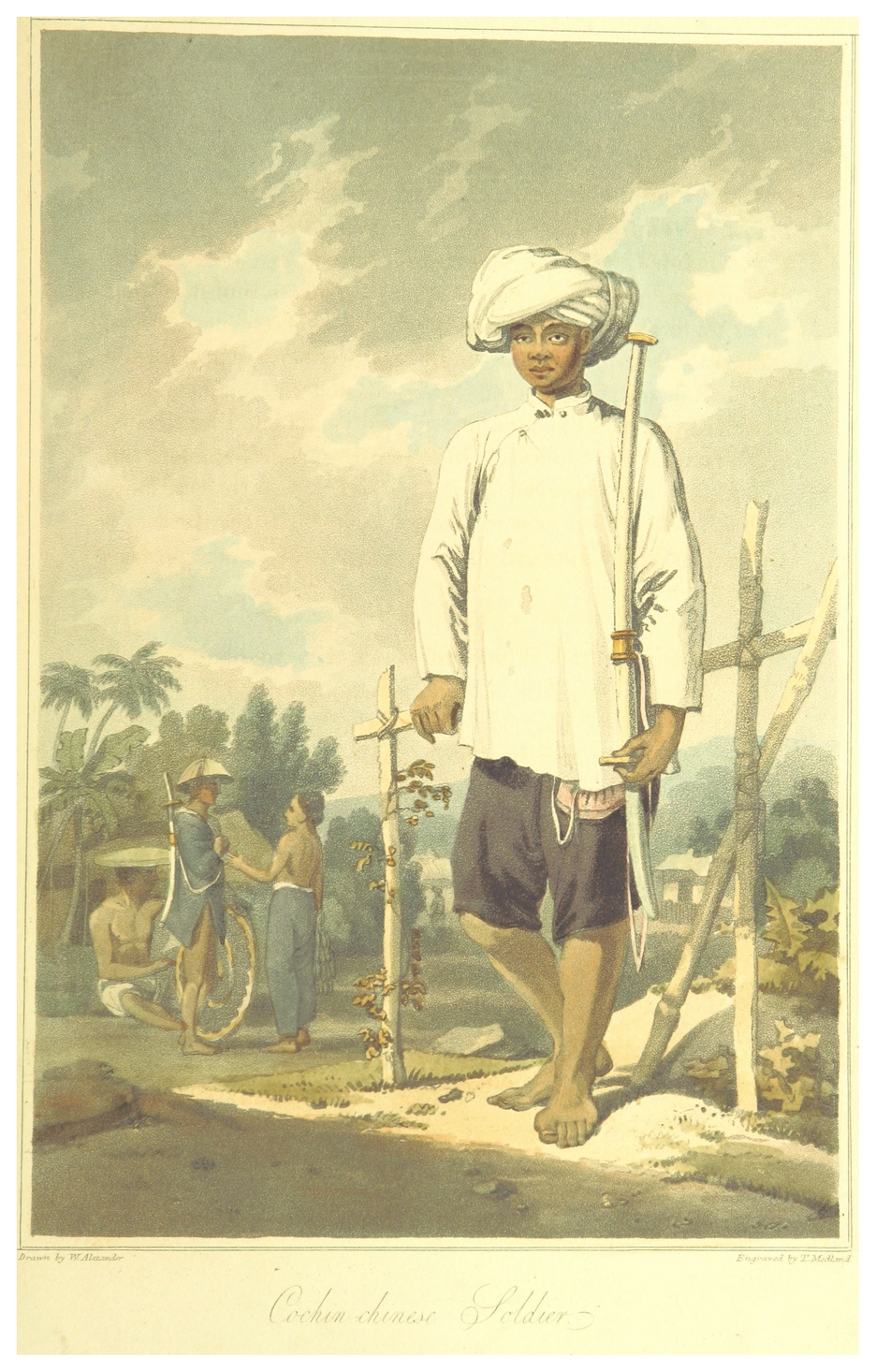
Two Tay Son soldiers

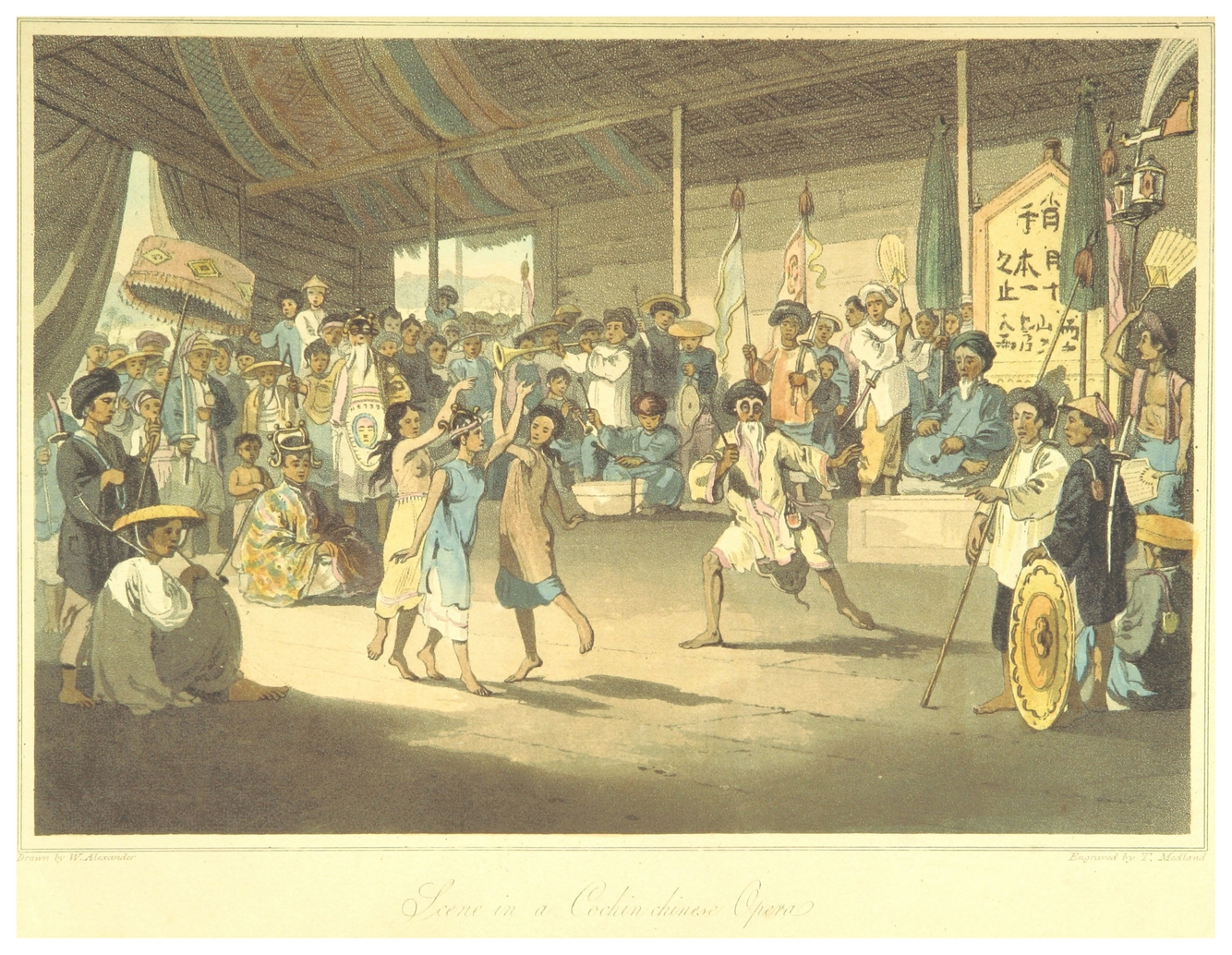
An opera house in Phú Yên, 1793

After his victory over the Qing, Quang Trung embarked on a two-pronged campaign to solidify his position. In the first instance he sought to assure himself of a lasting peace with the Qing. To this end he employed the services of two of the foremost northern literati, Ngô Thì Nhậm and Phan Huy Ích. Both had joined the Tây Sơn after the 1788 campaign against Vũ Văn Nhậm, which had effectively ended the rule of the Lê dynasty. Through a combination of supplication and veiled threats, these Tây Sơn diplomats were able to convince the Qing court to forgo any further efforts to restore the Lê family. More important still, Quang Trung's diplomats secured Qing acknowledgment of their new emperor's authority, and the Qing ruler enfeoffed him as the A Nam Quốc Vương (National King of A Nam). A Vietnamese delegation also traveled to the Qing court in late 1789 to pay their respects. The Qing emperor had insisted that Quang Trung come on this delegation in person. Reluctant to take such a risky journey, the Vietnamese ruler sent a double in his stead. It was this figure who was greeted by the Qianlong Emperor as the new ruler of Đại Việt when he arrived at the Qing summer capital at Jehol. By all accounts the several weeks spent by the Vietnamese delegation at the Qing court were ones of mutual amity and respect. Missions such as this one and the parallel correspondence between the two sides ensured tranquil relations, and the Qing remained on the sidelines in the continuing Vietnamese struggles between the Tây Sơn and the Nguyễn. The Qing recognized the Nguyễn only after 1802, when all traces of the Tây Sơn court had been removed. With the vanishment of the Trịnh lords and the Lê monarchs, by 1789 the Tây Sơn and the Nguyễn lord remained as the only two warring factions of the civil war.

Having established a good relationship with the Qing, Quang Trung turned to pressing domestic concerns. Quang Trung first moved the Tây Sơn base to The years of political chaos and warfare had taken a dramatic toll on the economic and social welfare of the territory under Tây Sơn control. Consequently, Quang Trung placed a high priority on attempting to restore order and economic productivity. He issued a proclamation calling for displaced peasants to return to their fields and established tax levels that encouraged this return and that rewarded the cultivation of abandoned fields. In addition to mandating the return of populations to their home villages, the new Tây Sơn emperor ordered a nationwide census and the establishment of a system of identity cards. Everyone would be issued one of these cards, and those found without a card were subject to immediate impressment into the Tây Sơn armies. Also in the realm of social policy, and no doubt guided by his northern Confucian advisers, Quang Trung ordered the inception of a project to oversee the translation and then publication of the Confucian classics from the original Chinese into nôm, the vernacular semi-phonetic script. The emperor also sought to revive the moribund educational system, including attempting to create a nationwide system of local schools to be run by local scholars and reviving the examination system. Although only one provincial-level examination was held before his death in 1792, this effort reflected Quang Trung's desire to establish an institutional base for his new regime.

Quang Trung's generals engaged in at least two invasions of the Lao territories, ostensibly as punishment against the ruler of Luang Prabang, who had failed to send a required tribute mission. The first attack in late 1790 saw 50,000 troops invade Lao territory adjacent to Nghệ An, the Kingdom of Vientiane, tried to cut through Laos to attack Nguyễn Ánh from the rear. A second campaign the following year used a smaller force of 10,000 troops but marched farther into the interior, eventually seizing Luang Prabang in the fall of 1791. After looting the Lao capital and then marching as far as the Siamese border, the Tây Sơn army withdrew. Quang Trung also engaged in diplomacy with European outposts in Macao and the Philippines. Hoping to persuade the Europeans to trade with his regime instead of that of his Nguyễn rival, he sent emissaries carrying messages requesting the establishment of trading relations to Manila and Macao. These efforts were largely unsuccessful as most Europeans had established commercial relations with the Nguyễn, which they did not wish to harm by trading with their rivals. Nevertheless, the Portuguese at Macao did make some preliminary gestures in response to the Tây Sơn regime's overtures. A Tây Sơn embassy visited Bangkok in 1791 to propose friendly intercourse with Rama I, Nguyễn Ánh's ally, to air their grievances against Nanthasen, who was accused of invading Vietnamese areas. Finally, Quang Trung also stimulated cross-border trade with China and arranged with the Qing emperor to establish new trading markets in the border region. The Tây Sơn presented themselves as the rulers of the ancient realm, the Hundred Yueh (V. Bach Viet), which had held the territory in what were now the provinces of Guangdong and Guangxi. They were also sponsors of a growing Chinese pirate network that they used against the resurgent Nguyễn lord in Gia Định. Only Nguyễn Ánh's defeat of the Tây Sơn forces in 1802 brought an end to the flourishing pirate network based in Vietnamese waters.

== Tây Sơn–Nguyễn War, 1792–1802 ==
=== Weakening of the Tây Sơn ===
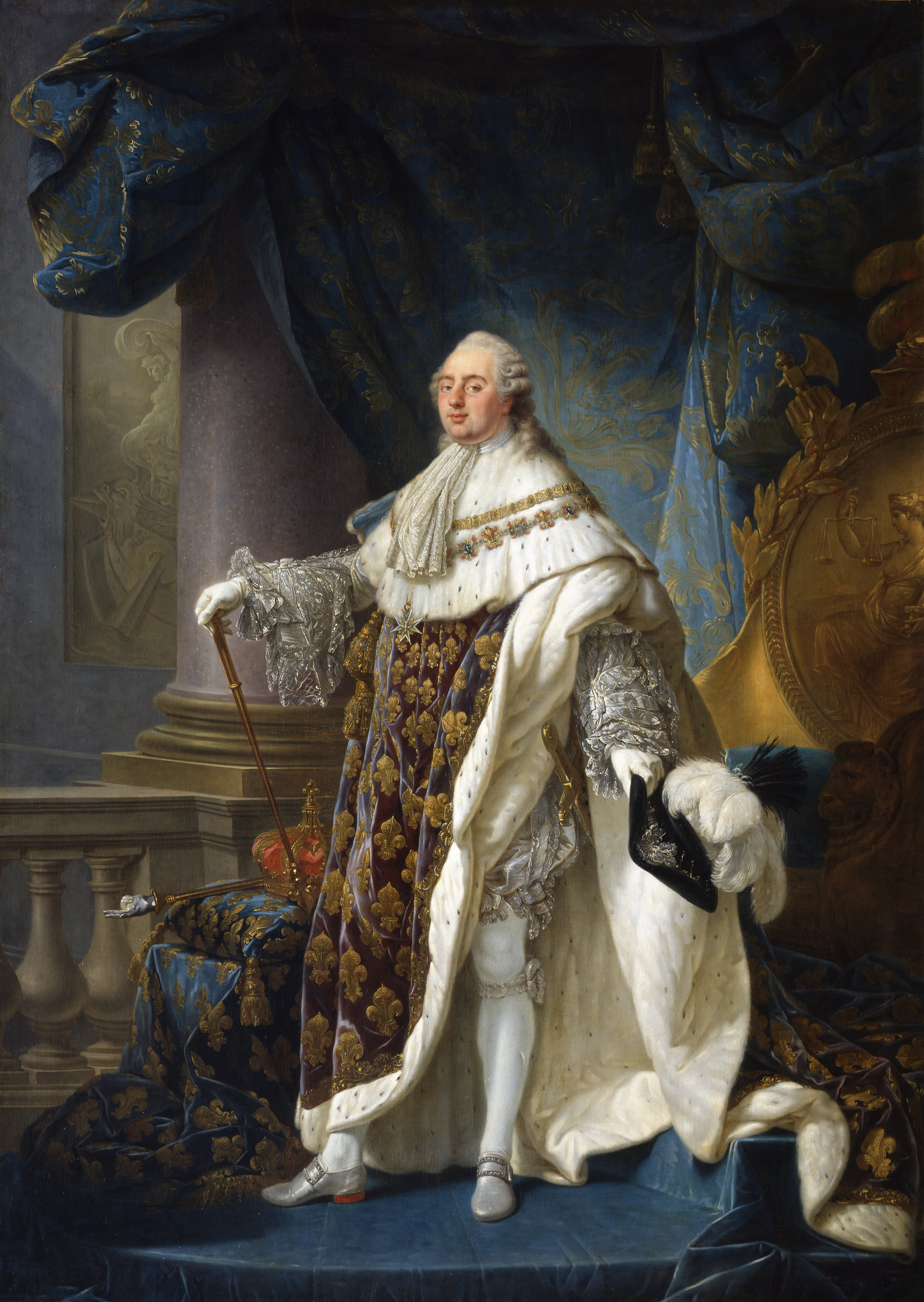
French king Louis XVI who signed treaty with Nguyễn Ánh was overthown in 1789.

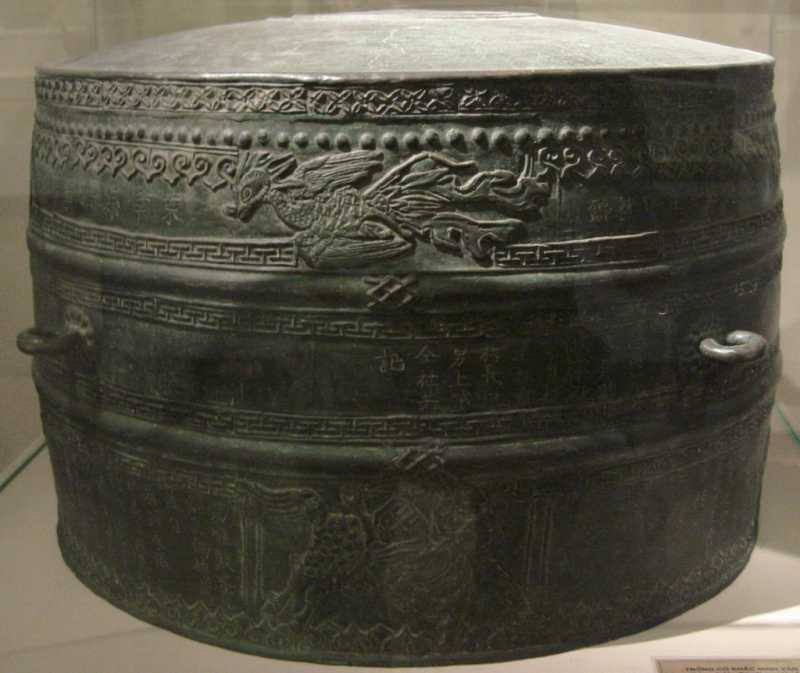
A royal bronze drum of Tây Sơn emperor Cảnh Thịnh, cast in 1800.

Quang Trung and Nguyễn Lữ died in the same year, 1792. At the time of his unexpected death in September 1792, Quang Trung/Nguyễn Huệ was only forty years old and on the cusp of launching a massive attack against Nguyễn Ánh's forces in Saigon. His eleven-year-old son Nguyễn Quang Toản (r. 1792–1802) ascended the throne under the title of Cảnh Thịnh Emperor. The young monarch reigned under the supervision of a maternal uncle, Bùi Đắc Tuyên, who served as regent but harbored plans for his own son and faced opposition from other Tây Sơn commanders. The next year, the Tây Sơn senior leader Nguyễn Nhạc died at the age of fifty, only a year after his younger brother. After Nhạc's death, his young son Nguyễn Văn Bảo was named by his cousin Emperor Cảnh Thịnh as Nhạc's successor, but without any imperial trappings. Bảo was only to be titled hiếu công (filial duke) and was to be controlled by a delegation sent to Qui Nhơn for this purpose by his cousin.

The Tây Sơn regime's failure to bring corruption under control may be attributed to the exigencies of ongoing warfare and the often limited bureaucratic skills of the rebel leaders and their close aides, both of which kept Tây Sơn administrative structures ad hoc in many places. While it could be said that the post–Quang Trung period was one of decline for the Tây Sơn regime, this decline was neither precipitous nor entirely assured until the last year or so of Tây Sơn rule. Even with their two main military and political figures gone, Tây Sơn generals continued regularly to challenge the Nguyễn. Although not as ambitious as his father in terms of introducing socioeconomic changes, Quang Toản, as Emperor Cảnh Thịnh, did undertake several political initiatives. He abruptly canceled his father's unpopular "trust card" program shortly after taking power. He carried out at least one census in an effort to continue his father's attempts to restore population stability. Cảnh Thịnh also promoted some changes on the religious front. Probably guided by Confucian advisers, the new emperor ordered the consolidation of the countless Buddhist temples that dotted the countryside. These were to be dismantled, and larger Buddhist structures, centrally situated and serving a large area, were to be built from the gathered materials. In addition, and in response to suspicions about missionaries and their perceived allegiance to the Nguyễn, he cracked down on Christianity beginning in 1795. As numerous missionary letters attest, this crackdown was far from systematic. Increasingly, however, Cảnh Thịnh found himself abandoned by the northern Confucian literati who had once eagerly provided assistance to his father. The charisma of Quang Trung could not be transferred to his young son, and even the scholars who had been optimistic that the new Tây Sơn regime might reverse the decades of decline seen under the Trịnh slowly abandoned the new government. Moreover, the growing military threat posed by the Nguyễn came to increasingly preoccupy the court at Huế.

=== Nguyễn retake the Mekong Delta ===
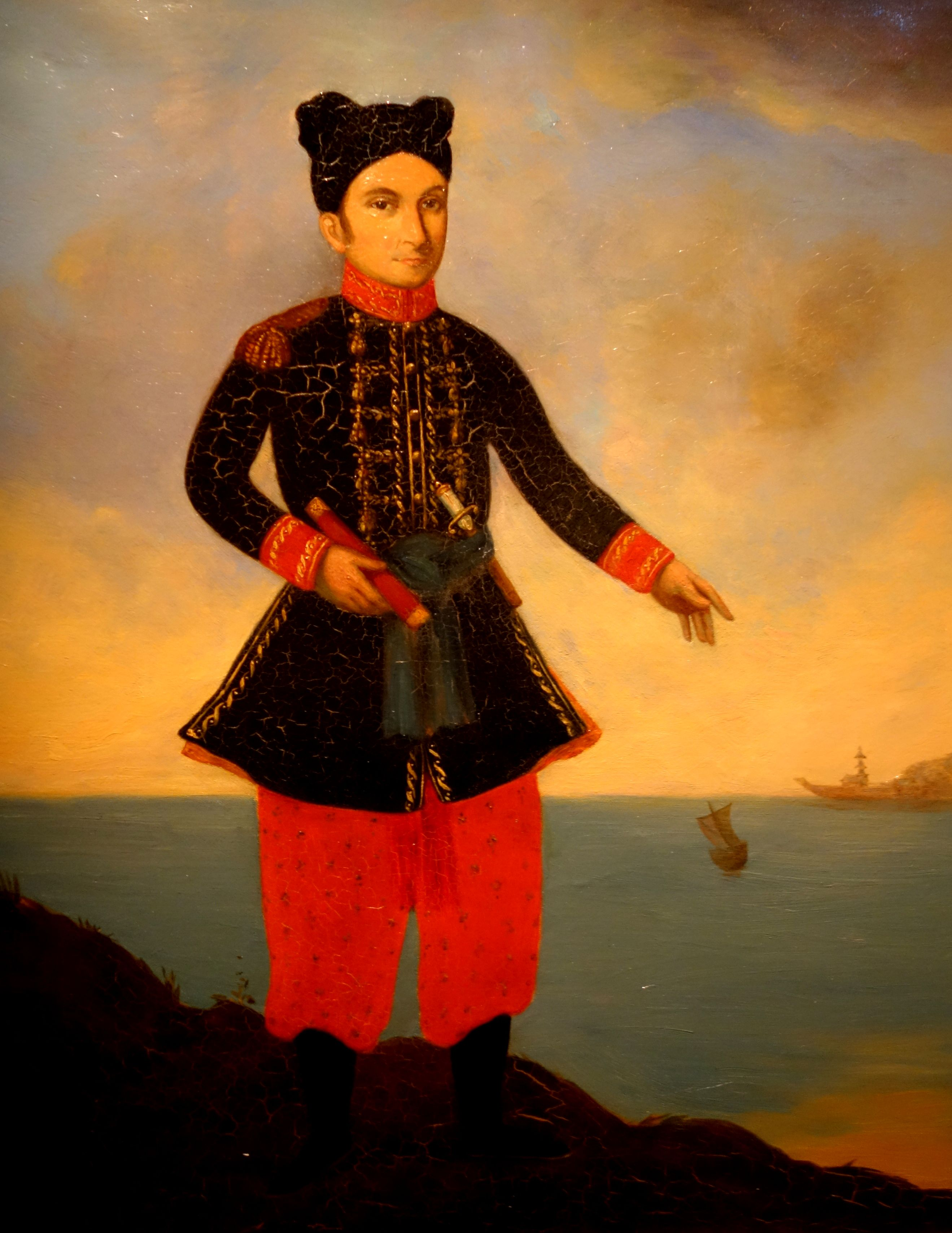
Portrait of French Navy officer Jean-Baptiste Chaigneau in Vietnam, 1805

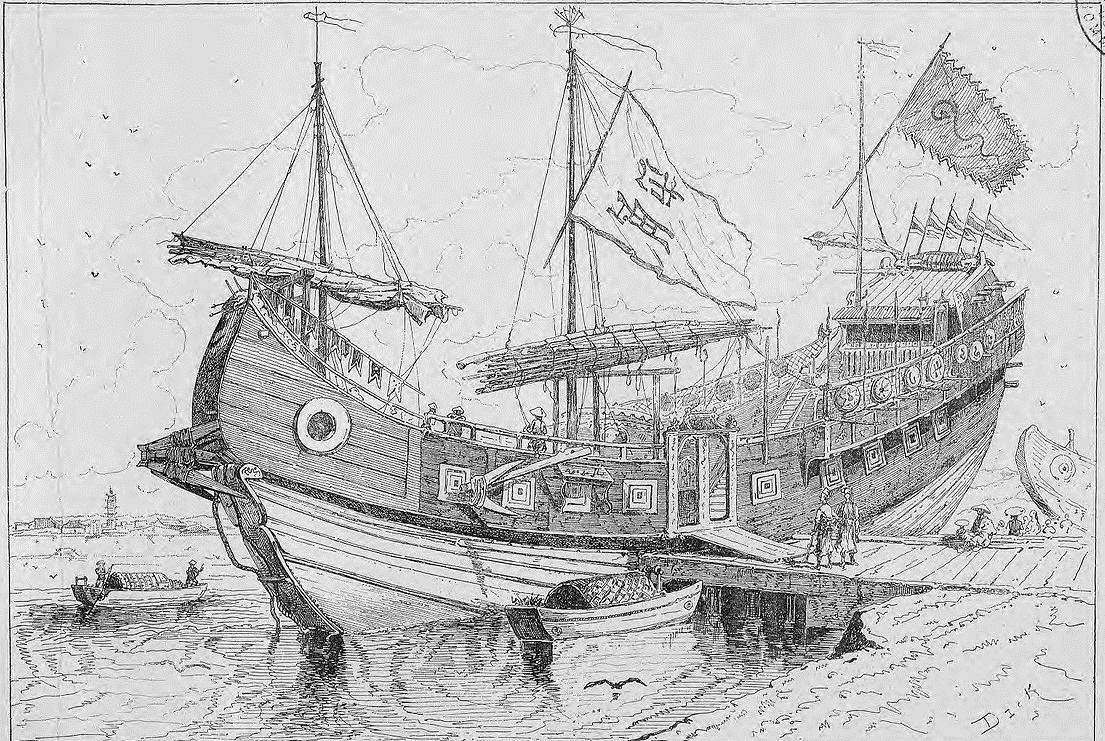
18th and 19th-century Vietnamese vessels were built based on French model

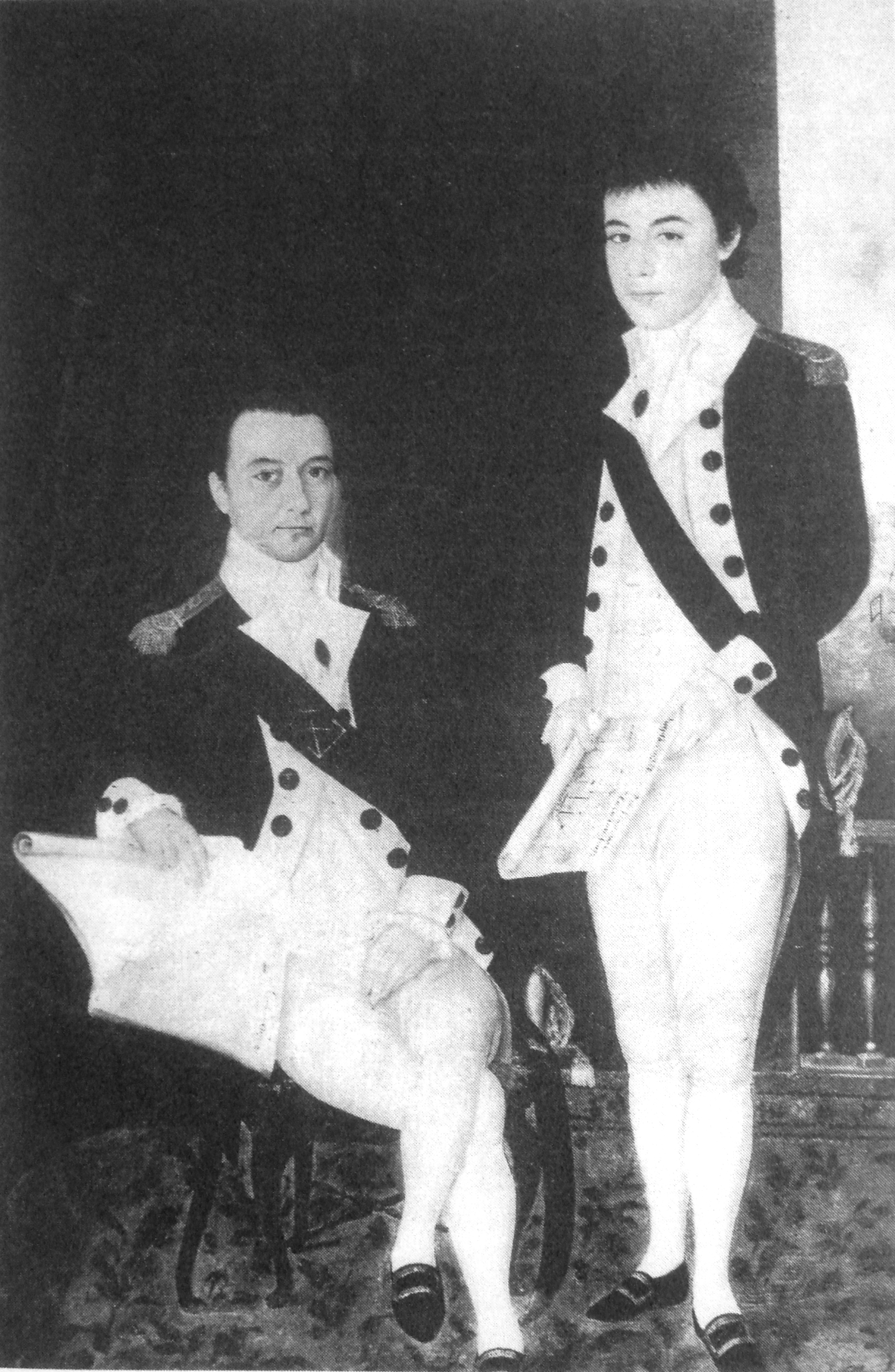
Jean-Marie Dayot (left) took a leading role in the Navy of Nguyễn Ánh.

After their defeat in 1785, the Nguyễn had been forced to flee to Bangkok with their Siamese allies, and there Nguyễn Ánh and a small group of followers plotted their return. In Siam, Nguyễn Ánh asked Pigneau to appeal for French aid, and allowed Pigneau to take his five-year-old son Prince Nguyễn Phúc Cảnh with him. Pigneau also tried to obtain help from Manila, but the party of Dominicans he sent was captured by the Tây Sơn. Pigneau de Behaine arrived in Pondicherry with Prince Cảnh in February 1785. From Pondicherry, he also sent a request for help to the Portuguese Senate in Macao, which would ultimately lead to the signature of a treaty of Alliance between Nguyễn Ánh and the Portuguese on 18 December 1786 in Bangkok. They left Pondicherry for France in July 1786 and arrived in February 1787. On November 21, his party and King Louis XVI of France, Minister of the Navy de Castries and Minister of Foreign Affairs Montmorin signed the Treaty of Versailles, in which the French promised they would deploy four frigates, 1,650 fully-equipped French soldiers, and 250 Indian sepoys in return for Côn Đảo and harbour access at Da Nang, with De Fresne as supposed commander. The French ruler left the ultimate decision on whether to execute the treaty to the discretion of his representative in Pondicherry. This official regarded the project as unworthy of French involvement and, to Pigneau's dismay, canceled it. This was due to the parlous financial state of the country prior to the French Revolution. Pigneau was helped by Pierre Poivre, who had previously been involved in pursuing French commercial interests in Vietnam. Undeterred, Pigneau used some of his own funds and promises of suitable rewards to gather a group of French mercenaries and several European ships, with which he set sail for Cochinchina in the summer of 1789. By this time, having taken advantage of the internecine battles between Huệ and Nhạc, Nguyễn Ánh had already departed Bangkok and retaken his old base at Saigon. Pigneau returned to south Vietnam with 14 French officers, 360 soldiers and 125 sailors, and began training Nguyễn Ánh's Cochinchinese troops in the modern use of artillery and European infantry methods.

In 1790, Olivier de Puymanel, a former officer of the Dryade who deserted in Poulo Condor, built in 1790 the Citadel of Saigon and in 1793 the Citadel of Dien Khanh according to the principles of Vauban. In 1791, the French missionary Boisserand demonstrated to Nguyễn Ánh the usage of balloons and electricity. Puymanel suggested that these be used to bombard cities under siege such as Qui Nhơn, but Nguyễn Ánh refused these adoptions. In 1792, Puymanel was commanding an army of 600 men who had been trained with European techniques. Puymanel is said to have trained the 50,000 men of Nguyễn's army. By 1792, a strong fleet was built, with two European warships and 15 frigates of composite design. Nguyễn Ánh used his new Chu Su Naval workshop to improve his inferior navy, which was much smaller than the Tây Sơn fleet and hitherto unable to prevent their rice raids. On the other hand, Siam repeatedly called on the Lao kings to assist Nguyễn Ánh against the Tây Sơn. In the same year, the Vientiane king Nanthasen dispatched a mission to congratulate Nguyễn Ánh for recapturing Saigon from the Tây Sơn. Chinese, Malay, Cambodian, Siamese and Western troops were recruited to assist the Nguyễn army in his struggle against the Tây Sơn.

From 1787 until 1792, Nguyễn Ánh consolidated his position in the south, taking firm control of the area so long contested between the two rival armies. Nguyễn Nhạc appears not to have had the desire or capacity to launch an attack capable of dislodging the Nguyễn from their southern stronghold. Nhạc directed periodic attacks against the Nguyễn, but none succeeded in more than temporarily stalling the incremental Nguyễn movement up the coast. The Nguyễn regime traded rice, cotton fabric and raw silk for iron, black lead and sulphur from the Chinese. With the assistance of the Westerners, Nguyễn Ánh's regime exploited all routes from Malacca, Java, the Philippines, and Bengal to obtain weapons and ammunitions.

=== Nguyễn offensive in 1792–1793 ===
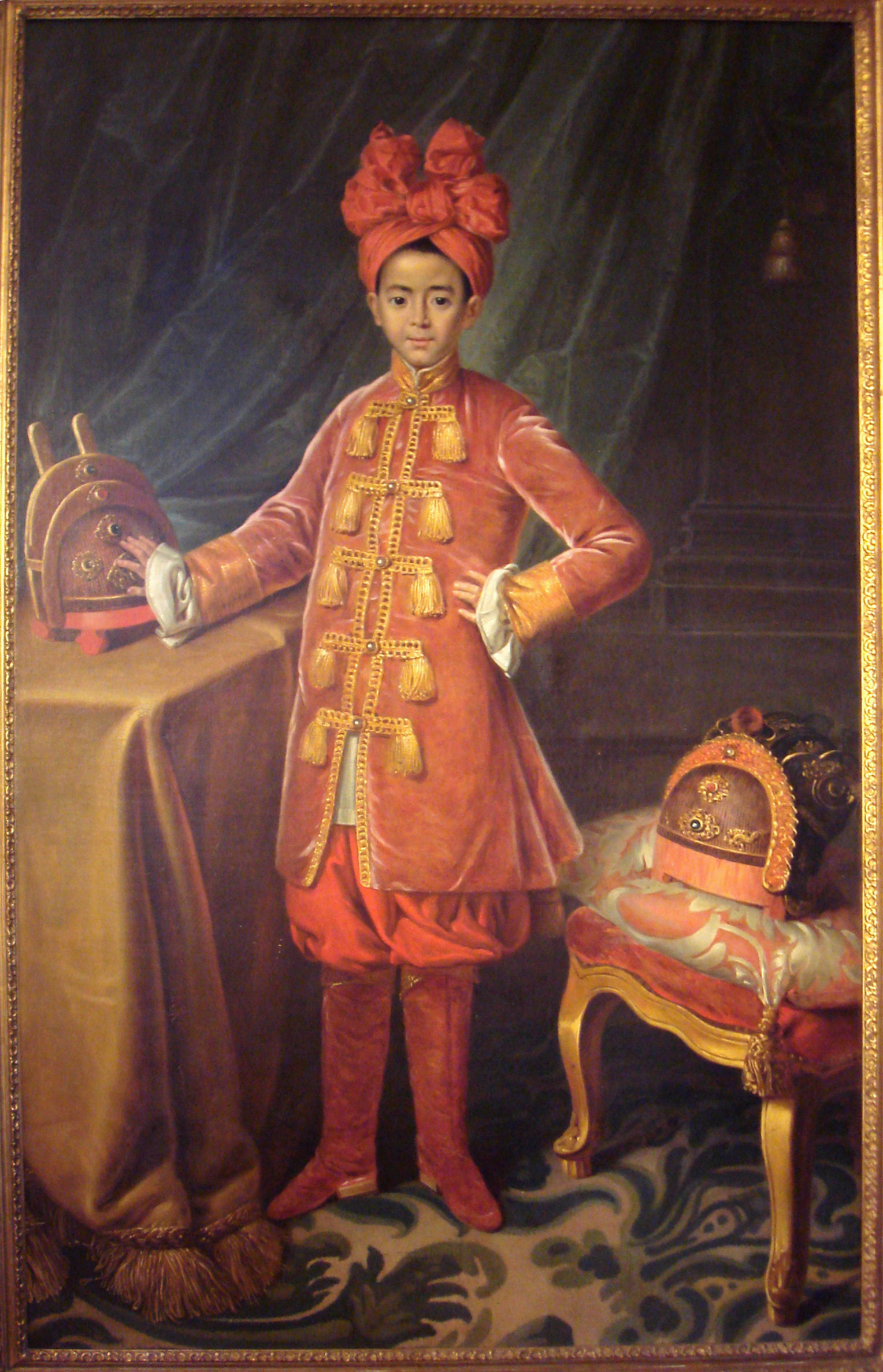
Portrait of Prince Canh, Nguyễn Anh's first son in France, 1787.

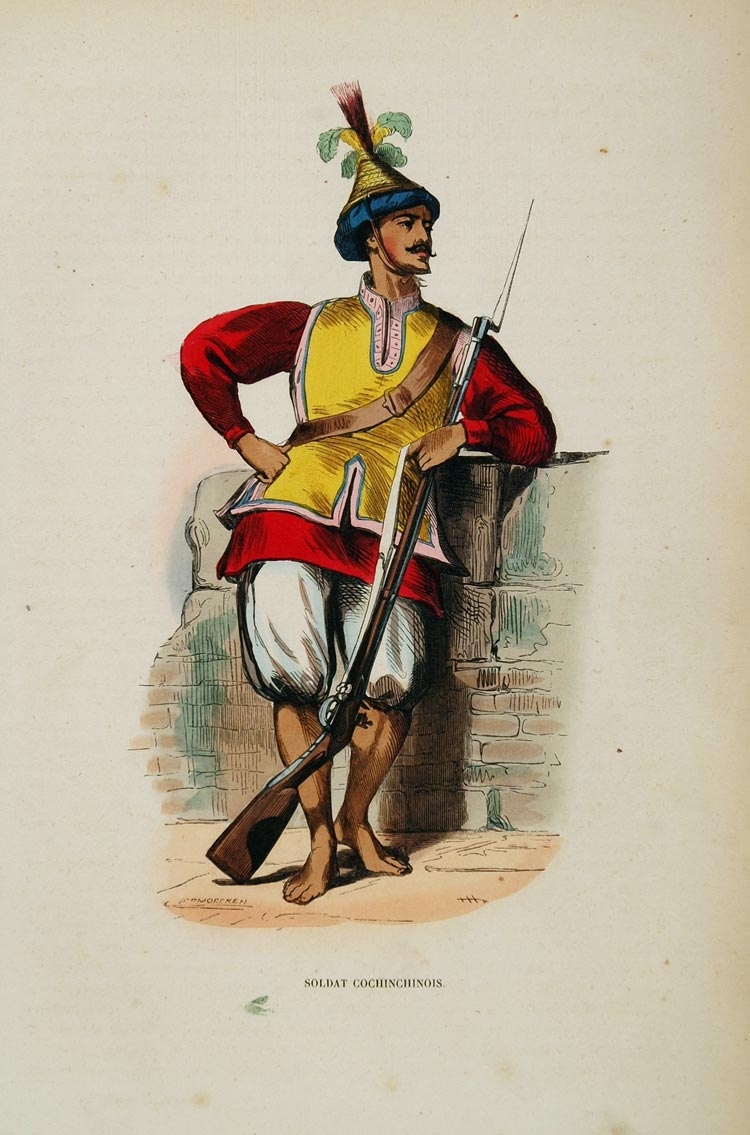
Depiction of a Nguyễn Vietnamese soldier, 1844

The military campaigns of the 1790s paralleled those of the 1770s and early 1780s, in that they were dictated by the coastal winds and were sometimes referred to as the “monsoon wars.” Each side would attack when the winds favored the ready movement of their naval forces. Although each camp possessed large numbers of infantry troops, movement by sea was far more efficient. On the other hand, movement by sea also meant that without a decisive victory, neither side could sustain its attacks or easily consolidate its victories. To extend one's campaign, particularly against a distant target, was to risk missing the wind patterns that would enable a return to one's base. Instead, the attackers would be left highly vulnerable to a subsequent counterattack. It was because of this pattern that Nguyễn progress in the wars was so slow, much to the despair of European advisers, who frequently lamented Nguyễn Ánh's seemingly overly cautious approach.

The target of the Nguyễn in virtually all of these campaigns was the southern Tây Sơn capital near Qui Nhơn and that city's coastal port of Thị Nại. In summer 1792, the Nguyễn launched an attack which succeeded in encircling Nguyễn Nhạc at Qui Nhơn. Jean-Marie Dayot led the Nguyễn force, opening the way for the Nguyễn fleet which then defeated the Tây Sơn fleet. Caught off guard, Nhạc's commanders were forced to abandon their substantial navy, and its vessels were all either captured or destroyed by the Nguyễn. A second Nguyễn siege the following year was only lifted after a desperate plea from Nhạc to his nephew, Quang Trung's successor, summoned sufficient reinforcements. From Huế, the Cảnh Thịnh Emperor was able to send Nhạc substantial reinforcements: 18,000 troops, eighty elephants, and thirty war junks. From 1794, Pigneau himself participated in all the campaigns, accompanying Prince Cảnh. He organized the defense of Diên Khánh when it was besieged by a much larger Tây Sơn army in 1794. The 1792 destruction of Nhạc's fleet at Thị Nại, followed by Nhạc's death in 1793, represented major setbacks to the Tây Sơn efforts to challenge the Nguyễn for control over the south. Thereafter, the Tây Sơn appear increasingly to have relied on ethnic Chinese pirates to supplement their now limited naval strength.

Following the Nguyễn northward offensive, the Nguyễn reoccupied Bình Thuận, leading to the defection from the Tây Sơn of several Cham leaders there and, in 1794, to their betrayal and assassination of the Tây Sơn's leading Cham ally, the king of Champa, Nguyễn Văn Tá (r. 1780–1793) (Chưởng Cơ Tá). The Nguyễn abolished the title “King of Champa” and put the pro-Nguyễn Nguyễn Văn Hào (r. 1793–1799) as chưởng cơ lĩnh chánh (primary leading captain).

=== Tây Sơn counterattack in 1795 ===
In the spring of 1795, Tây Sơn troops counterattacked against the Nguyễn forces and chased them back toward Bà Rịa, southeast of Saigon. This was, however, to prove the last major Tây Sơn counteroffensive toward the deep south, and the Tây Sơn thrust was brief. An army of 1,500 Khmers was organized in Trà Vinh and, along with other Gia Định militia and reserve units, was ordered forward. The Tây Sơn forces were pushed back. Meanwhile, Nguyễn Ánh was with his fleet, filled with supplies and troops, waiting for the winds to change. When they did, he sailed to Nha Trang to disembark an army to relieve Diên Khánh, then continued to Phú Yên to disembark another army to block the Tây Sơn from escaping back north. During the next four months, fighting raged from Bình Thuận to Phú Yên. Defeated in Bình Thuận, Tây Sơn forces withdrew and joined the armies besieging Diên Khánh. At the same time, an army of uplanders helped Nguyễn Ánh to obtain an important victory in Phú Yên.

Bình Thuận briefly changed hands again in 1795, and an ineffective anti-Nguyễn Cham revolt led by Tuần Phù broke out the next year. The surviving Tây Sơn–appointed Cham king, Nguyễn Văn Chiêu, accompanied by a large number of followers, fled to Cambodia, where they settled permanently. The Nguyễn appointed their trusted Cham partisan Nguyễn Văn Chấn (r. 1799–1822) as ruler of Champa in 1799. Nonetheless, the local Cham population held on to their historical identity, increasingly referring to their principality not as Thuận Thành but as Prădară, a term devolved from its ancient name Pāṇḍuraṅga, in contrast to the Vietnamese derivation Phan Rang.

=== Nguyễn campaign in Da Nang (1797) ===
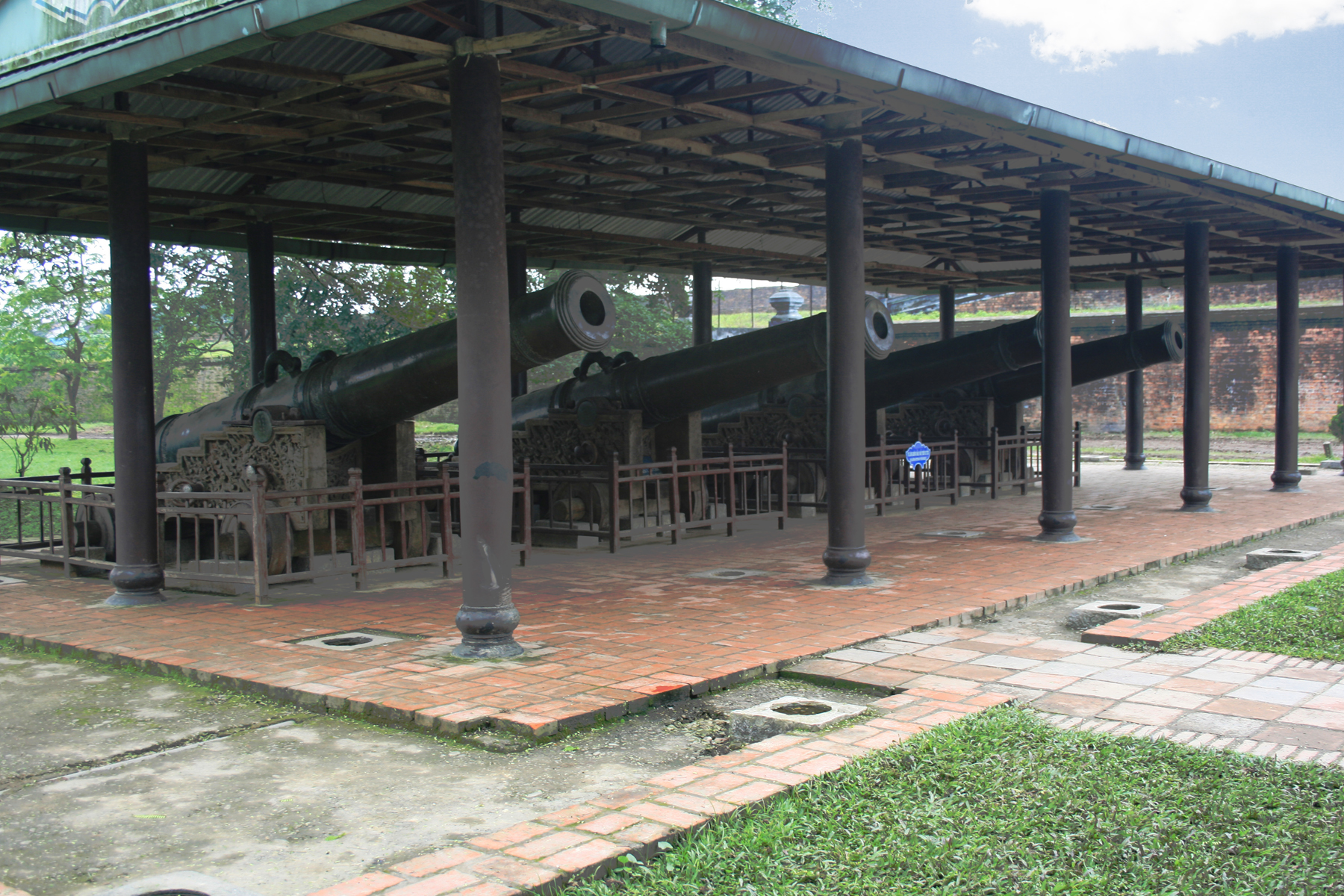
Nine holy cannons of the Nguyễn dynasty, cast in 1802.

A Nguyễn attack in the spring of 1797 bypassed the usual target of Qui Nhơn, heading instead farther north into the heart of Tây Sơn territory. This expedition led to a Nguyễn occupation of the city of Da Nang (Tourane) that lasted for two months before it was finally abandoned.

=== First battle of Qui Nhơn (1799) ===
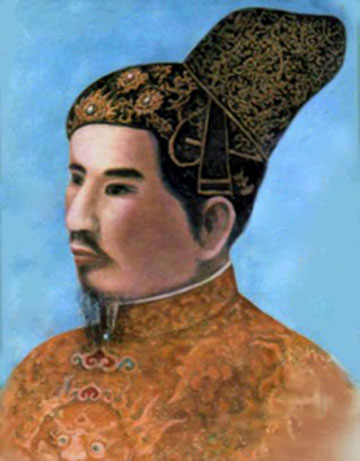
Portrait of Nguyễn Phuc Anh in 1800

Nguyễn Ánh spent the last months of the year 1797 dealing with Chams who had been serving with the Tây Sơn. Siamese troops assisted in calming this problem, perhaps in return for Vietnamese troops helping to suppress an uprising of minority peoples in Cambodia a short time before. At this time, discussions were initiated to coordinate Siamese and Lao troops with Nguyễn Ánh's future campaigns by having them march over the mountains and down the Cả River valley into Nghệ An to threaten the Tây Sơn from behind. A diplomatic initiative was also taken to cultivate good will with the Qing Empire. Chinese pirates captured from the Tây Sơn fleets were sent into the custody of Qing authorities in Guangdong.

In 1799 Nguyễn Ánh commenced a two-pronged offensive directed both at the Tây Sơn political center at Huế and their southern capital at Qui Nhơn, composed of three sloops of war commanded by French officers, each of them with 300 men, 100 galleys with troops, 40 war junks, 200 smaller ships, and 800 transport boats. After consulting with Prince Cảnh, who was in command at Diên Khánh, he ordered his land forces to march north through Phú Yên toward Chà Bàn. Nguyễn Ánh sailed ahead and seized the port of Qui Nhơn, assisted by dissension among the Tây Sơn generals there. He then sent Lê Văn Duyệt to northern Bình Định Province to block Tây Sơn armies marching south. Lê Văn Duyệt rallied Êdê chieftains in the mountains to assist in barring the passes leading from Quảng Ngãi into Bình Định. The Tây Sơn armies came through the passes in two columns. One of the columns dissolved in panic when a forward scout shouted “nai! ” upon seeing a herd of deer. Nai is the word for “deer”, but it was also northern slang for soldiers from Gia Định, deriving from the Đồng Nai (“deer field”) River where Vietnamese first began to settle in the Mekong region. Soldiers following the scout picked up the cry of “Nai! Nai!” This filled the column with fear of an ambush and provoked a stampede to the rear. The Tây Sơn soldiers were no longer as fearsome as they had been twenty-five years before.

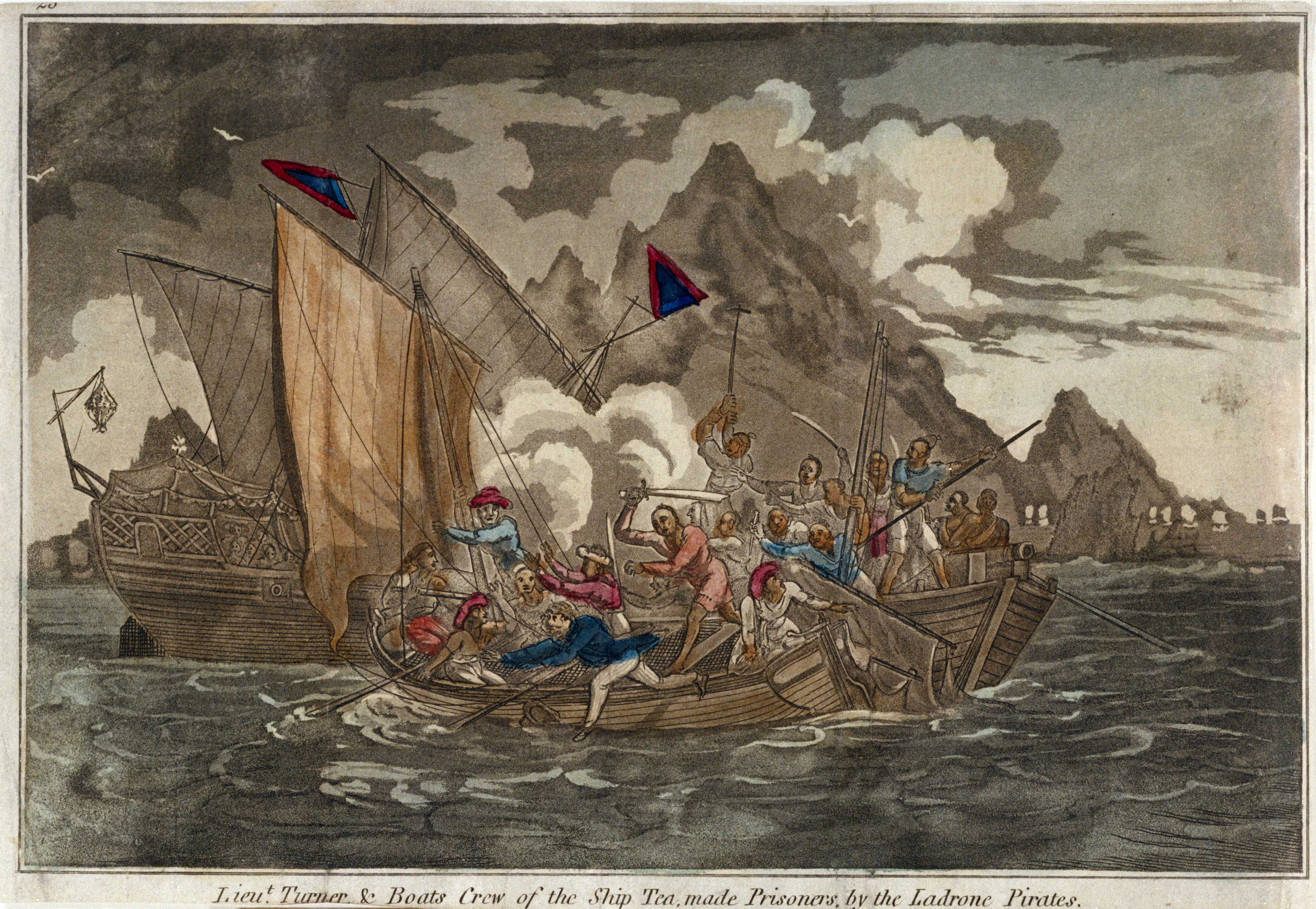
Pirates of the South China sea who allied with the Tây Sơn regime

Meanwhile, Nguyễn Ánh's fleet defeated a Tây Sơn fleet as his land forces advanced and took Nguyễn Nhạc's old capital, Chà Bàn, near the modern city of An Nhơn. In this campaign, a Vietnamese general leading a force of Khmers with Siamese officers rallied upland peoples to assist along the mountain flanks. In June of that year, Qui Nhơn was finally captured by the Nguyễn. Ánh changed the city's name to Bình Định ("Pacification Established"). The Tây Sơn, again heavily supported by pirate forces, initiated a siege of Qui Nhơn that was to last for an entire year. The Tây Sơn forces ultimately were unable to retake the city, but they were able to seize nearby Phú Yên, which then served as a base for their counterattacks. With the threat to Huế posed by the Nguyễn attack in 1799, the young Tây Sơn ruler, Cảnh Thịnh, had fled northward, hoping to rally support for another counteroffensive. He carried out ceremonies to rededicate his forces and changed his reign name to the more auspicious Bảo Hưng (Defending Prosperity). He issued edicts to rally the population in preparation for a defense of the north against the expected Nguyễn invasion.

Even with the setback suffered by the Nguyễn side, the Tây Sơn were unable to counter the inexorable Nguyễn advance up the coast. Nguyễn Ánh spent over three months in Bình Định collecting rice, organizing supplies, recruiting soldiers, appointing administrators, fixing taxes, selecting students, seeking out those who had remained loyal, honoring the dead, building storehouses, organizing post stations, and positioning his soldiers, including a force of ten thousand Siamese. Over one thousand men from Bình Định were selected for their “strength and quickness” and trained to handle artillery. In October 1799, Nguyễn Anh's long-time confidant and liaison with the Europeans, Pigneau, died. Nguyễn Ánh brought his body back to Saigon and gave him a burial with honor. The French forces in Vietnam continued the fight without him until the complete victory of Nguyễn Ánh in 1802.

=== Second battle of Qui Nhơn (1801) ===
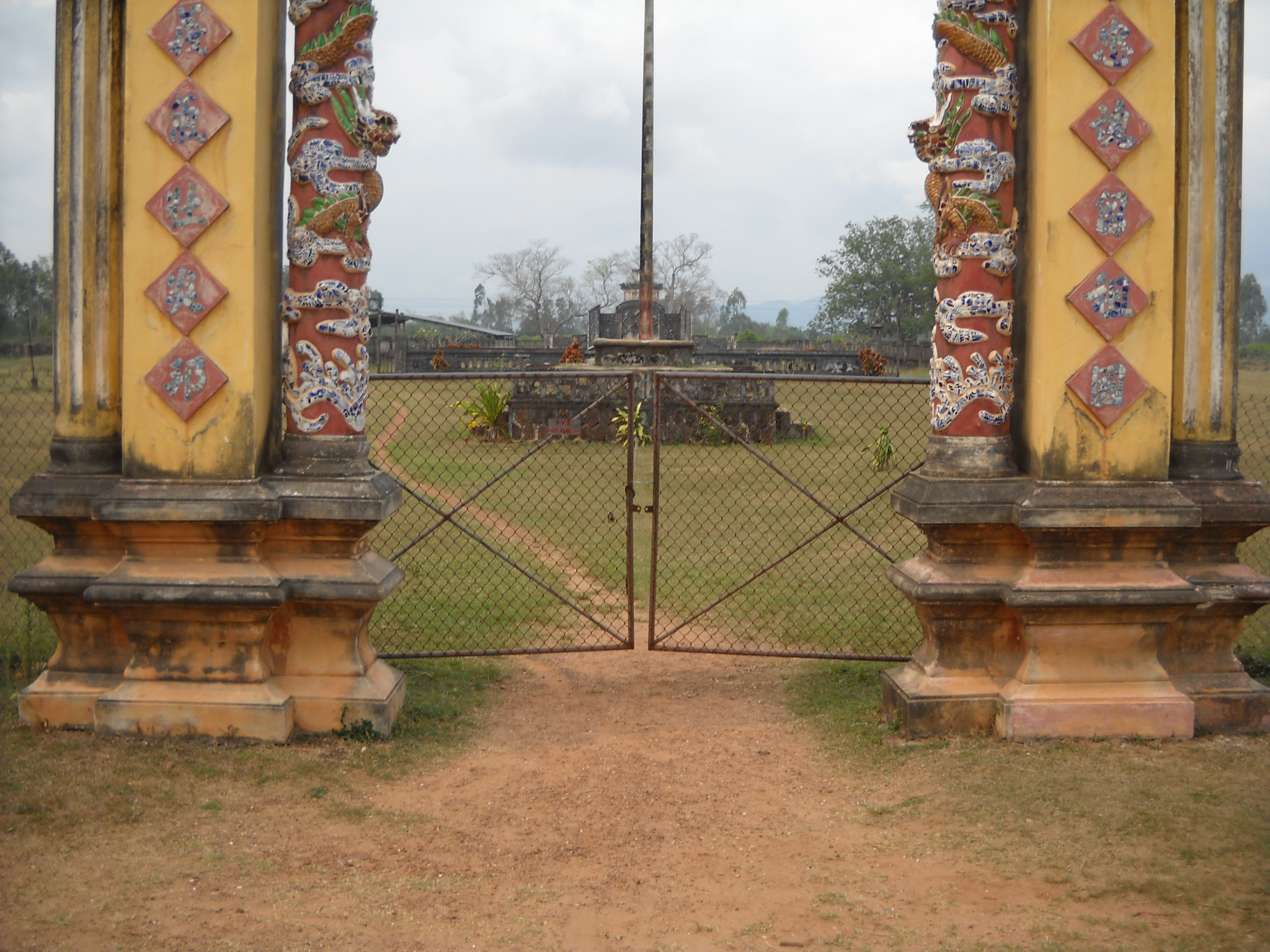
Remains of the gate amid nearby ruins of the Tây Sơn's palace in Qui Nhon

After suppressing a Cham uprising in Phan Rang and mobilizing Khmers to pacify marauding uplanders north of Saigon, Nguyễn Ánh started his land forces marching north in summer 1800 and prepared to sail as soon as the winds changed. Ships bearing rice sent by his ally, Rama I, joined his supply fleet. At the beginning of summer, Nguyễn Ánh arrived at Nha Trang and met with his land forces at Diên Khánh before sending them forward into Phú Yên, which for months had been disturbed by Tây Sơn forays and one of his generals who had turned traitor. When he received word that the King of Cambodia, Ang Chan II, had sent an army of 5,000 men and ten elephants, Nguyễn Ánh instructed Prince Cảnh at Saigon to send the Khmers north. News arrived that his Lao allies were attacking into Nghệ An assisted by the highlanders of that province. He turned to Lê Văn Duyệt and ordered him to advance. Lê Văn Duyệt pushed forward into Bình Định and reached the Tây Sơn siege walls, but could go no further. Nevertheless, Nguyễn Ánh's ships seized a Tây Sơn supply fleet on the northern coast of Bình Định and, shortly after, captured a fleet of Chinese pirates in Tây Sơn service. A few weeks later, the Tây Sơn suffered major naval defeat at Qui Nhơn in February 1801. The Nguyễn captured 13,700 Tây Sơn soldiers in the battle. The French took an active part in the battle. Chaigneau described the battle in a letter to his friend Barizy:

"We have just burnt all the navy of the enemies, so that not even the smallest ship escaped. This was the bloodiest fight the Cochinchinese had ever seen. The enemies fought to the death. Our people behaved in a superior manner. We have many dead and wounded, but this is nothing compared to the advantages the king is receiving. Mr Vannier, Forsanz and myself were there, and came back safely. Before seeing the enemy navy, I used to despise it, but I assure you this was misconceived, they had vessels with 50 to 60 cannons."

— Letter from Jean-Baptiste Chaigneau to Barizy, 2 March 1801.

These victories dramatically changed the battlefield situation in Nguyễn Ánh's favor, significantly strengthening his position in Bình Định. Just at that the moment, news arrived that Prince Cảnh had died of smallpox. Sending word to his Laotian allies to renew their attacks, he sailed to Hội An, landing troops to join with local men from Quảng Ngãi and Quảng Nam who rallied to his banner. After collecting rice in Quảng Nam and capturing more Chinese pirates at sea, he sailed to Da Nang Bay and advanced to Huế. Tây Sơn forces offered little resistance as Huế quickly fell and the Tây Sơn emperor Cảnh Thịnh fled to the north.

However, the Nguyễn land forces were still blocked in Qui Nhơn by a spirited defense of the remaining Tây Sơn positions being carried out by the wife-husband team of Bùi Thị Xuân and Trần Quang Diệu. The Tây Sơn forces, after a seventeen-month campaign, even recaptured Qui Nhơn in summer 1801. They held it only briefly, and for the last time. It was the last victory for the Tây Sơn regime, and a meaningless one. European observer reported that Tây Sơn and Nguyễn casualties in Qui Nhơn were over 54,000.

=== Final Tây Sơn resistance ===
The final blow came in the spring of 1802, when Nguyễn Ánh's forces unexpectedly bypassed the Tây Sơn forces in Qui Nhơn and sailed farther up the coast to attack the northern half of the country directly. Despite some Tây Sơn resistance, the Nguyễn had little difficulty making landfall at Sơn Nam and then marching quickly northwest toward the capital city of Thăng Long, where the Tây Sơn emperor Cảnh Thịnh had taken refuge in the previous year. Nguyễn Ánh entered the city on July 20, 1802, commencing the reign of the final Vietnamese dynasty. Although there continued to be sporadic pro–Tây Sơn attacks in the north, and despite deep-rooted Lê loyalism, the Nguyễn began their effort to integrate the various geographical parts of the country.

In the aftermath of the Nguyễn victory, the surviving Tây Sơn leaders were rounded up, and some, including Cảnh Thịnh and all members of his immediate family as well as the noted female general Bùi Thị Xuân, were pulled apart limb from limb. Others, such as the officials Ngô Thì Nhậm and Phan Huy Ích, were publicly flogged, a beating that caused Nhậm's death within a year. Not content with punishing the living, Nguyễn Ánh ordered the exhumation of the remains of his long-time rivals Huệ and Nhạc. He then directed that their bones be ground into a powder and ordered his soldiers to urinate on them. In this manner, Nguyễn Ánh sought to ensure that the period of Vietnamese history that has subsequently been labeled the “Tây Sơn era” was definitely over.

== Aftermath ==
=== Establishment of the Nguyễn dynasty ===
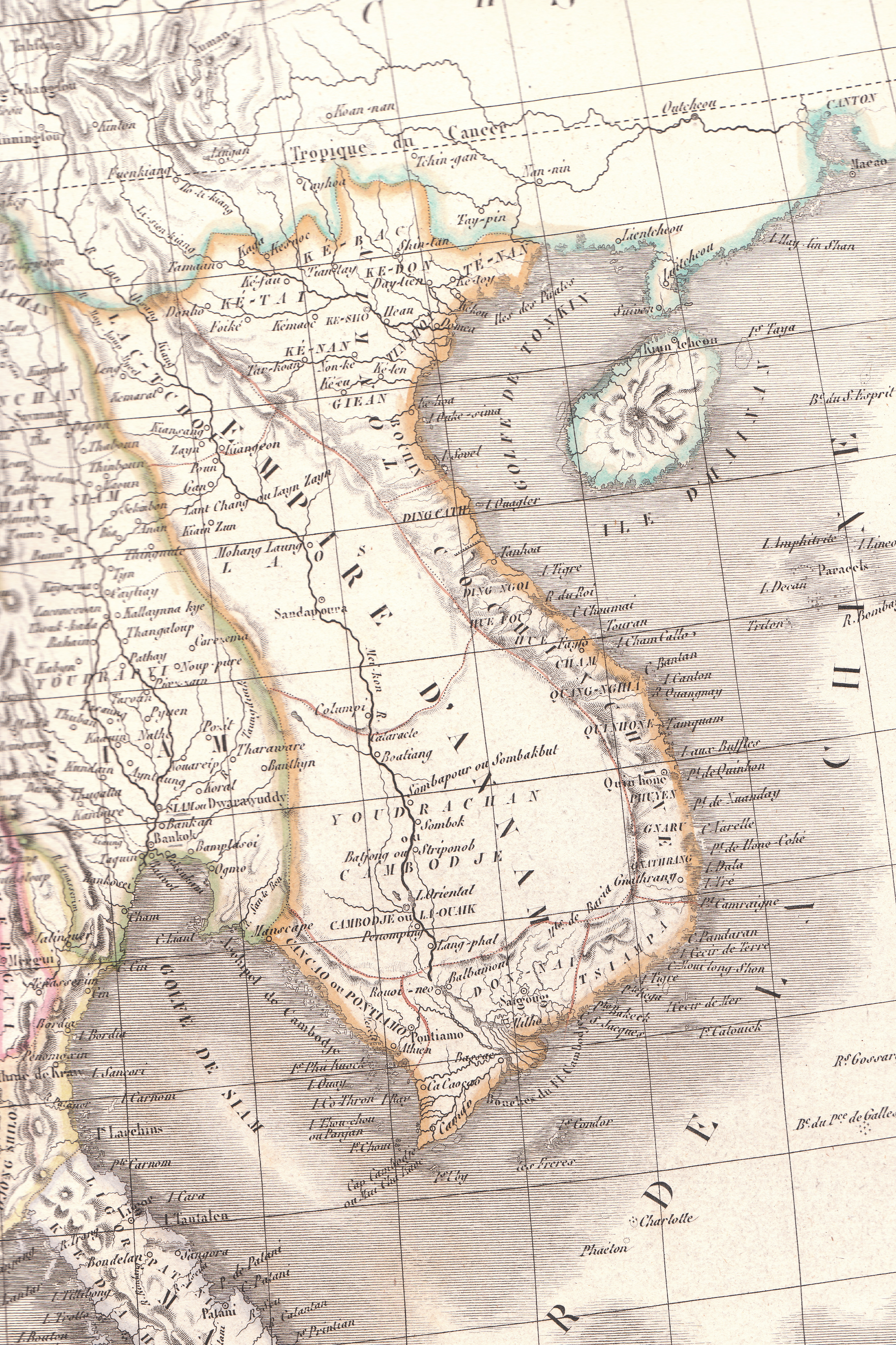
Map of unified Vietnamese Empire by Pierre M. Lapie in 1829.

In June 1802 in Huế, Nguyễn Ánh proclaimed himself the Gia Long Emperor and renamed the country from "Đại Việt" to "Việt Nam". After a quarter-century of continuous fighting, Gia Long had unified these formerly fractious territories, ultimately leading what is now modern Vietnam and elevated his family to a position never previously occupied by any Vietnamese royalty. Gia Long became the first Vietnamese ruler to reign over territory stretching from China in the north, all the way to the Gulf of Thailand and the Cà Mau peninsula in the south.

The new Nguyễn leader adopted a system of government that invoked the fifteenth-century golden age of Lê Thánh Tông's Hong-duc reign (1470–97). The Nguyễn were believed to have also borrowed some elements from their immediate Qing present as well as from China's and Vietnam's own pasts, much as the Lê rulers in the fifteenth century had drawn on their own contemporary Ming model and their own past back to when Đông Kinh had been in the orbit of the Tang dynasty. Although unifying the country under a single leader, the Nguyễn triumph did little to resolve the conflicts that had been stirred up by the Tây Sơn wars. The peasant discontents that provoked the Tây Sơn uprising, and that were then exacerbated by it, were not adequately addressed by the new regime. Tây Sơn loyalists continued to find ways to stir up unrest despite the relentless Nguyễn efforts to remove all traces of Tây Sơn rule. The remaining sons and grandsons of Nguyễn Nhạc were tracked down in 1830, and they were publicly executed.

=== Roles of ethnic Chinese and Vietnamese Catholics ===
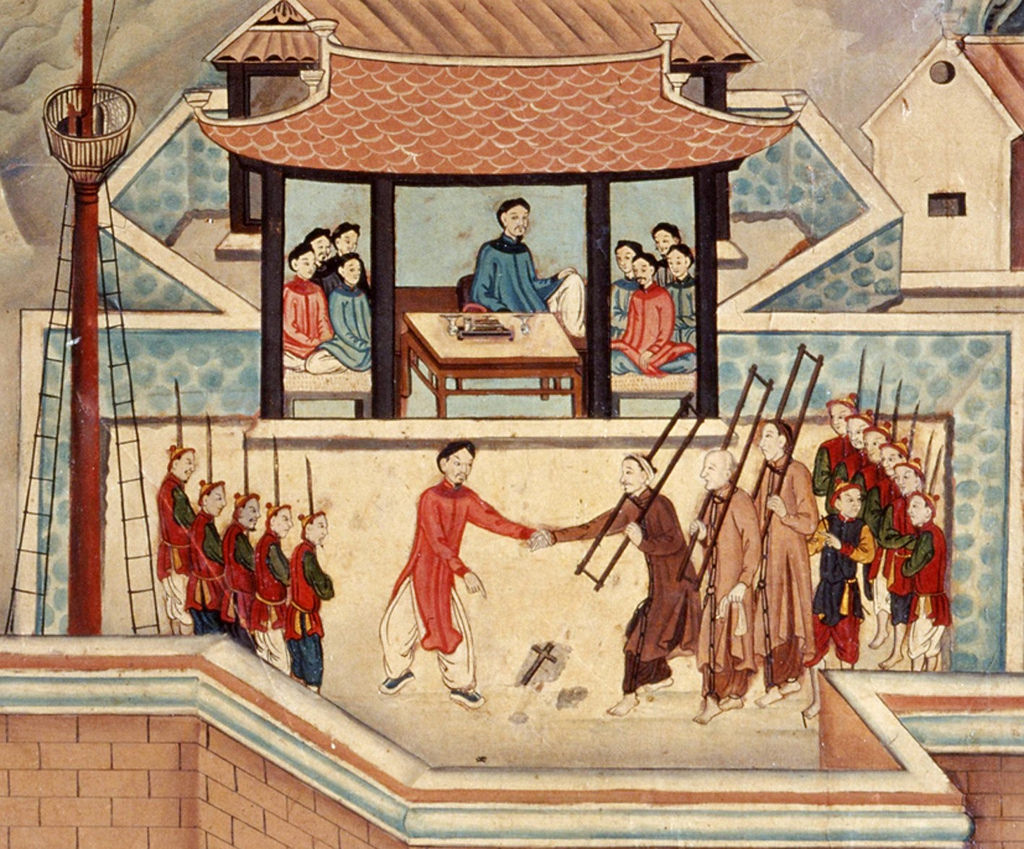
Painting depicts the trial and execution of three Catholics in Ninh Bình

Ethnic Chinese played an important role during the Vietnamese civil war. Chinese refugees had arrived in south Vietnam following the collapse of the Ming dynasty in 1679. The Nguyễn lords granted them formal permission to settle in the coastal areas of south Vietnam, and soon thereafter settlements were established in various parts of the Nguyễn realm. The Nguyễn decision to permit this heavily armed party to settle in their territory stemmed in large part from the fact that the Chinese refugees were seen as potentially useful for settling areas that were still lightly populated and in many cases only loosely controlled by the court at Huế.

At the beginning of the Tây Sơn rebellion, the majority of Chinese joined and financed the Tây Sơn. One missionary wrote: "in the province of Cham [Quảng Nam] the rebels made an agreement with the Chinese, promising that if they gave their support in this enterprise, to liberate their populations from the tyranny that they suffered to that time and to name one of their mandarins as the King of Cochinchina." However, ethnic Chinese also joined the Nguyễn lord too, and in 1775 the Chinese under Lý Tài betrayed the Tây Sơn leaders to join with the Nguyễn lord in Saigon. According to some accounts, the armies of Tập Định and Lý Tài were responsible for harassing the populations and for molesting girls and women. In a 1775 letter the missionary Pierre Jacques Halbout noted that "the rebels . . . are for the most part Chinese, and they have committed a thousand abominations, such as eating human flesh, saying that this is tastier than other meats." A Spanish missionary letter of the same period described the Chinese armies as committing worse atrocities than the Tây Sơn and their rivals combined.

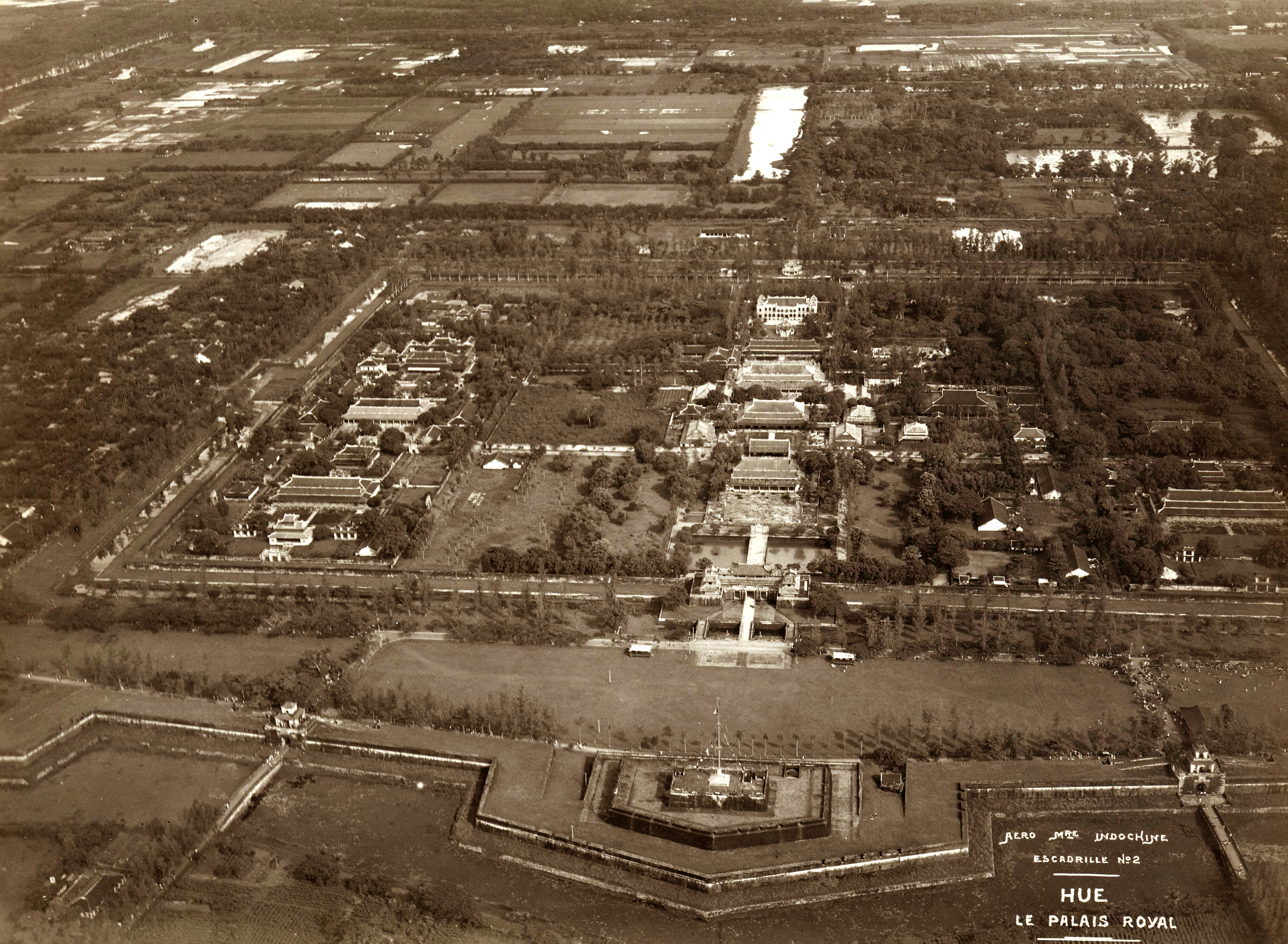
Aerial view of the Imperial Palace of Hue in 1932.

Lý Tài himself was killed during a fight with the pro-Nguyễn and anti-Chinese forces under Đỗ Thanh Nhơn in 1777. Because of the Chinese support for the Nguyễn, Tây Sơn armies appear to have specifically directed attacks against ethnic Chinese populations. Tây Sơn forces were reported to have carried out massacres of ethnic Chinese living in the central coastal port cities of Da Nang and Hội An in the mid-1770s, with a Spanish missionary reporting that "a number of Chinese were run through with swords; a number of others, in flight, were drowned in the river which ran near the city." In 1782, when the Tây Sơn forces entered Cambodia, "they went out to search for the Chinese who had fled from Cochinchina [and] they exterminated them without any other reason than for having embraced the party of the king." That same year, in the late spring, Tây Sơn relations with Chinese communities living in the Mekong Delta reached their nadir when the rebel forces massacred a large percentage of the Chinese population in Saigon, with estimates of the dead ranging from four thousand to twenty thousand. However, in the 1790s the Tây Sơn did not continue to pursue a consistent anti-Chinese policy and began employing and sponsoring Chinese pirates to serve them and fought against the Nguyễn lord.

Participation by Chinese groups such as Minh Hương in the Nguyễn power base was a major element in the new economic and political order. Most notably, their agricultural exports continued to fuel growth in Gia Định-Saigon. Overseas Chinese factions played significant roles in the formation of both the Chakri court in Siam and the Nguyễn court in Vietnam, though without the intermarriage with the royal family in Huế, as happened in Bangkok. Initially, the new Vietnamese state, like Siam, found it expedient to entrust much of its foreign commerce to Chinese merchants.

Although Christians as a group lay at the social margins, they were soon embroiled in the events of the Tây Sơn period, and there are some indications that they could be found at the very heart of the uprising. There are numerous anecdotes suggesting that the Tây Sơn brothers came from a family with Christian connections and may even themselves have been Christians. Spanish missionaries who had reported that their possessions had been looted by the rebels wrote that not long after this encounter they were visited by some Tây Sơn officials. In fact, the only Tây Sơn leader who was known to have actually persecuted Christians was Nguyễn Nhạc in central Vietnam. One missionary, the prolific Le Labousse, even remarked that it was fitting that Quang Trung, having never persecuted Christians, died a peaceful and dignified death, and Nguyễn Nhạc, having persecuted Christians for nearly a decade from the middle 1780s to the early 1790s, died ignobly and painfully. Several missionaries mentioned that a powerful mandarin at Quang Trung's court was in fact a Christian and provided protection for Christians throughout Quang Trung's reign as well as the reign of his son. Quang Trung and Cảnh Thịnh's relative tolerance of Christianity and Christian missionaries may be mild compared to the reported enthusiasm for Christianity of the youngest brother, Nguyễn Lữ. This brother, who had de facto control over the provinces of the far south for much of the late 1770s and early 1780s, even issued an explicitly pro-Christian edict from Sài Gòn in December 1783. Some sources even claim that Nguyễn Lữ was a priest, though the reliability of this claim could certainly be called into question. In any case, as long as Quang Trung held out the hope that he could win the missionaries, the Christians, or both to his side, he continued his policy of tolerance.

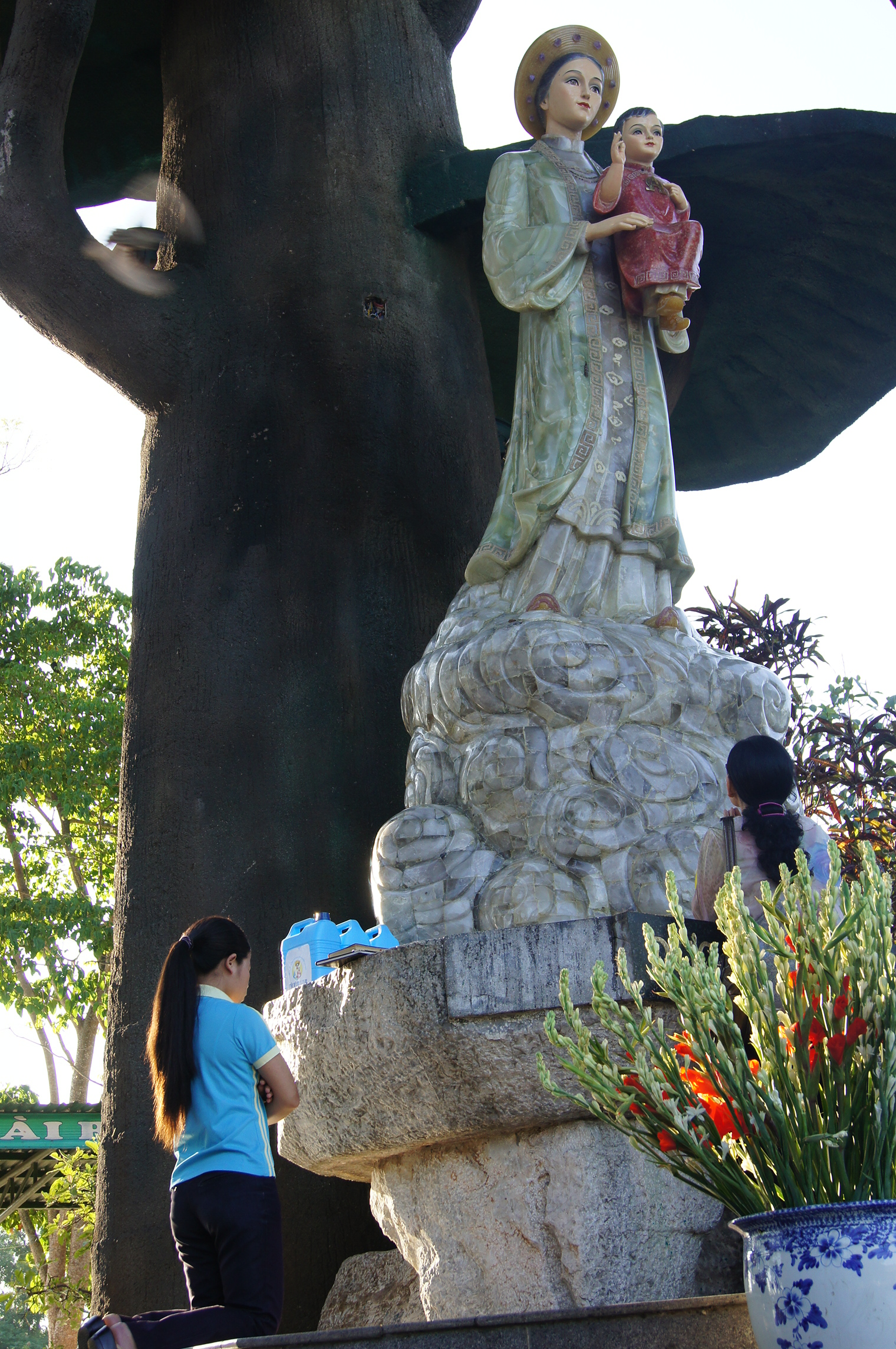
Our Lady of La Vang statue in Quảng Trị. On 17 August 1798, Cảnh Thịnh Emperor issued an anti-Catholic edict

After Quang Trung's death in 1792, the Tây Sơn began developing suspicions against Christians and missionaries due to the presence of Frenchmen and Catholics in Nguyễn Ánh's army, and in 1795 the Tây Sơn regime issued two anti-Catholic edicts through the Cảnh Thịnh Emperor. Anti-Christian sentiment developing at this time was directly linked to a fear that the Christians, whether missionaries or natives, were becoming Nguyễn partisans. In August 1798, Cảnh Thịnh again issued an anti-Catholic edict, reflecting Tây Sơn suspicion not merely of the missionaries, but of Christianized Vietnamese as well. The zenith of this persecution was reached on 17 September 1798, when a Vietnamese Christian, Immanuel Triệu, was executed along with six thieves. This marked the first public execution of a Christian since the death of Ferdinand de Olmedilla, the Spanish Dominican, in 1782.

In the summer of 1802, Nguyễn Ánh and his forces entered Hanoi, finally triumphant over the Tây Sơn. A chaotic era had ended for Vietnamese society, and yet for Vietnamese Christians 1802 did not mark a turning point. Although the new Nguyễn ruler had incurred debts to French missionaries in the course of his campaigns, his ascension to the imperial throne did not mark the triumph of religious freedom, but rather another chapter in the tensions between a quasi-Confucianized state and a heterodox faith.

=== Roles of other ethnic groups ===
Tây Sơn reliance on the Chams reflected the proximity of the uprising's home to the territory of the former Cham rulers. Moreover, by inducing the Cham princess Thị Hoả to join their movement, the Tây Sơn leaders were able to bring a sizable number of Chams into their army. For the Chams, the Tây Sơn may have represented an opportunity to restore some of their former political strength, while for the Tây Sơn the Chams and their semi-autonomous political centers constituted an alternative site of political power to be drawn upon in their struggle against the Nguyễn.

In early 1788, a Khmer named Ốc Nha Long joined the Tây Sơn, bringing a small number of boats with him. He fought the Nguyễn forces at Cần Thơ but was defeated.

== Legacy ==
The environmental and other crises that debilitated Đại Việt in the second half of the 18th century had their counterparts in the other major regions of mainland Southeast Asia. The powerful neighboring kingdoms of Burma and Siam both collapsed in 1752 and 1767–82 respectively, giving way to energetic new dynasties there as well. What happened in Đại Việt was similar but more complex and prolonged. As historian Alexander Woodside has written: “If mainland Southeast Asia was a crossroad of civilizations, ...traditional Vietnam was a crossroad within this crossroad, especially after it had seized the Mekong delta.” The three geographic regions of Đại Việt were culturally diverse, and they proved difficult to combine into a single polity. The tumultuous military history of the three-decade conflict known as the Tây Sơn rebellion reflected this extraordinary cultural variety and the chaotically rapid changes that convulsed early modern Vietnamese society in a period of ecological crisis.

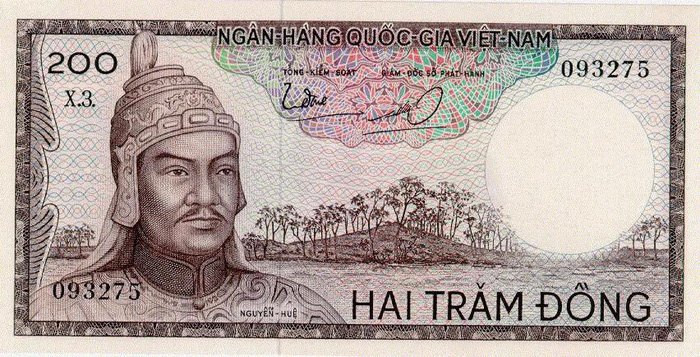
A South Vietnamese banknote with the portrait of Quang Trung.

Though itself short-lived, the Tây Sơn dynasty seems to have envisaged the length of Vietnamese history in distinctive ways, emphasizing not only Cham antecedents but indigenous Vietnamese themes, beyond the resort to nôm as the official written language of government. In his proclamation to his army in 1789, Quang Trung placed himself in a long line of Vietnamese leaders who had fought successive Chinese dynasties: “...Throughout all these periods, the South [Đại Việt] and the North [China] were clearly separated.” Tây Sơn documents from 1792 and 1802 show that Quang Trung and his successors even accorded noble status to two long-dead Việt women generals, Nguyệt Thai and Nguyệt Độ, who had served with the Trưng sisters in their revolt of 39–43 CE. In 1798, the Tây Sơn court established a new historical bureau with the mission to revise the old annals and compile a new national history of Đại Việt. Yet the partial reforms launched by the Tây Sơn support historian George Dutton's argument that the new dynasty was neither revolutionary nor even ideological in inspiration.

Its militarized governance replicated features of both the Trịnh and Nguyễn regimes, and in the north the Tây Sơn also drew upon the aid of Confucian scholars as the Trịnh had done there. Quang Trung's 1789 "Edict Seeking Worthy Men" (a rather successful appeal to the same northern scholars who had earlier scorned him as “Chế Bồng Nga”) and his prudent diplomatic reconciliation with China after his victory against it both suggest a nonideological approach to governance. His successor the Cảnh Thịnh Emperor's holding of a second census in 1801, his attempts in the mid-1790s to centralize control over the influential northern Buddhist hierarchy, and his sporadic crackdowns between 1795 and 1800 on northern Catholics suspected of sympathies with the Nguyễn's missionary backers also suggest historically tested pragmatic inclinations, though they were unsuccessful in ensuring the Tây Sơn regime's longevity. In neither Đàng Trong nor Đàng Ngoài did the Tây Sơn regime show any sense of religious inspiration, quite unlike the Vietnamese peasantry from whose ranks most of its followers came.

The Tây Sơn era's legacy was contested in the realm of historiography, in which different interpretations of the uprising and the regimes that it created developed over the course of the nineteenth century. The Nguyễn sought to depict the Tây Sơn as rebels and bandits who had never had any political legitimacy, even as they confronted the awkward reality that more than a few of the officials who came to serve their regime had previously been loyal to the Tây Sơn.

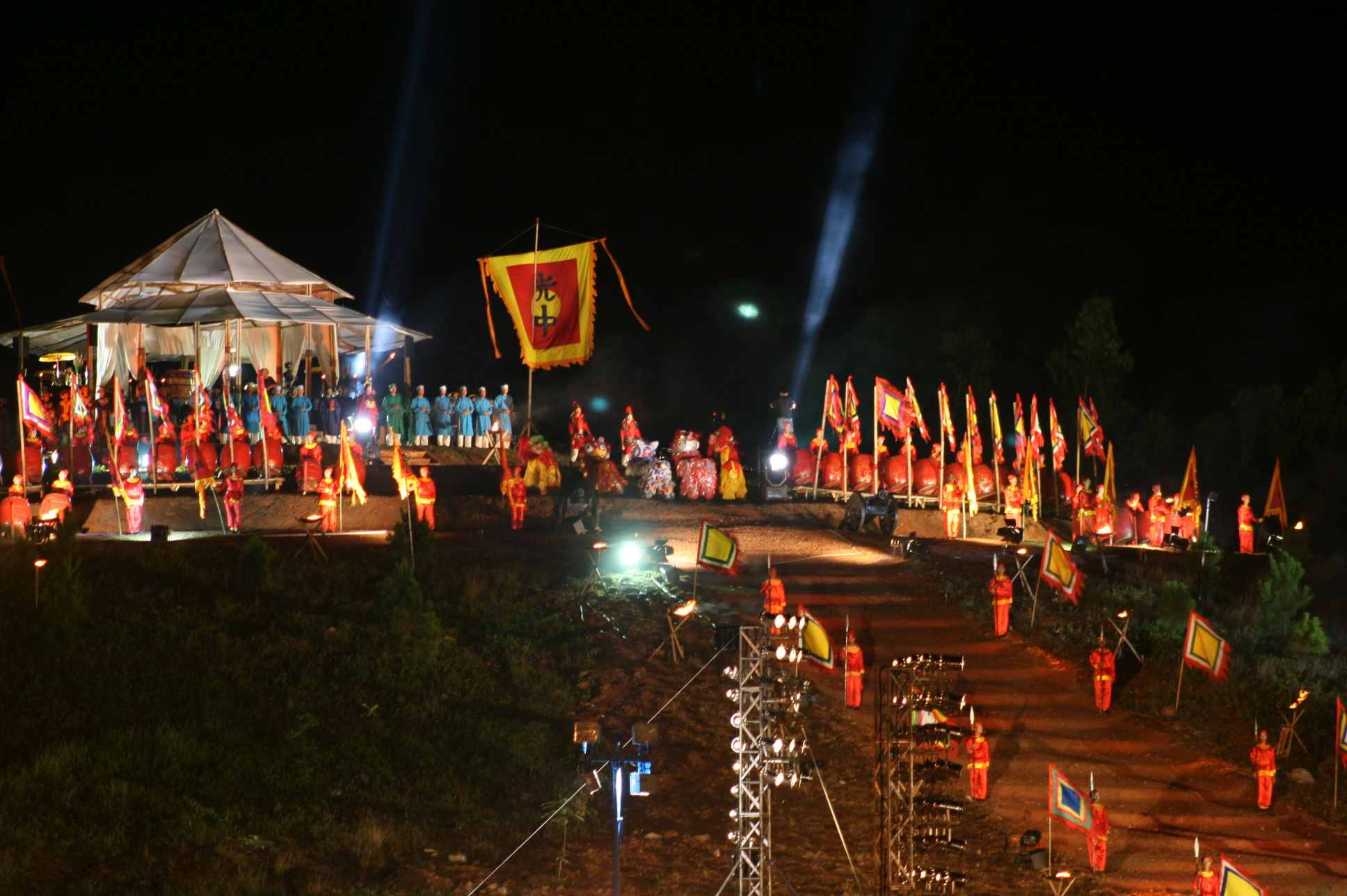
Theatrical performance depicting Nguyễn Hue proclaimed as Emperor Quang Trung

Moreover, while the Nguyễn could dictate the ways in which their official histories were written, they could not control the unofficial histories being privately recorded by scholars. With the decline of the dynasty and the onset of French colonialism, reinterpretations of the Tây Sơn era continued, with greater credit being given to Quang Trung for his efforts to create an integrated state and for having repelled the Qing invasion of 1789. Thus, the Nguyễn continued to be haunted by the Tây Sơn regime at several levels. Although the Nguyễn depicted themselves as the direct heirs of the Lê and refused to recognize even a Tây Sơn interregnum, they could not escape the fact that the Tây Sơn had ousted the Lê and ruled much of the country for more than a decade, leaving marks impossible to eradicate. Twentieth-century Vietnamese historians have often been highly critical of the Nguyễn and other historical annals for referring to the Tây Sơn as "bandits" (giặc).

Some mid-twentieth-century Vietnamese historians, notably Trần Huy Liệu and Văn Tân, looked at the political events of this period and saw in it a Vietnamese nationalist revolution (cách mạng). They characterized the Tây Sơn uprising as a focused effort to overthrow corrupt political forces, to reunify the country, to defend the nation against external threats, and to promote indigenous cultural elements. This interpretation of the movement conveniently reflected the political agenda of the post-1954 state in North Vietnam, even as it glossed over the true complexities of the Tây Sơn era. A closer examination makes it clear that the accomplishments of the Tây Sơn movement do not reveal a coherent ideological agenda on the part of its leaders. Moreover, although the uprising did result in a change of administration and some reorganization of the Vietnamese territories, its overall political impact was not revolutionary since most underlying political, economic, and social structures remained unaltered.

== See also ==
- Cochinchina Campaign

== Bibliography ==
- Buttinger, Joseph (1958). The Smaller Dragon: A Political History of Vietnam. New York: Praeger.
- Tarling, Nicholas (1999). The Cambridge History of Southeast Asia. Cambridge University Press. ISBN 9780521663724.
- Twitchett, Denis Crispin (1998). The Cambridge History of China: Volume 8, The Ming Dynasty. Cambridge University Press. ISBN 0-521-24333-5.
- Whitmore, John K. (2016), "The Emergence of the state of Vietnam", in Peterson, Willard J. (ed.), The Cambridge History of China: Volume 9, The Ch'ing Dynasty to 1800, Part 2, Cambridge: Cambridge University Press, pp. 197–233, ISBN 9781316445044
- Dutton, George Edson (2006). The Tây Sơn uprising: society and rebellion in eighteenth-century Vietnam. University of Hawaii Press. ISBN 0-8248-2984-0.
- Dutton, George Edson (2019). The Tay Son Uprising. Nhà xuất bản Tổng Hợp Thành Phố́ Hồ Chí Minh. ISBN 978-6045891636.
- Cady, John F. (1964). Southeast Asia: Its Historical Development. New York: McGraw Hill.
- Kleinen, John; Osseweijer, Manon (2010). Pirates, Ports, and Coasts in Asia: Historical and Contemporary Perspectives. International Institute for Asian Studies. ISBN 9789814279079.
- Mantienne, Frédéric (1999). Monseigneur Pigneau de Béhaine. 128 Rue du Bac, Paris: Editions Eglises d'Asie. ISBN 2-914402-20-1. ISSN 1275-6865.
- Marr, David G.; Zaretsky, Erwin V.; Parker, Richard J. (1981). Vietnamese Tradition on Trial, 1920-1945: Volume 10. University of California Press. ISBN 9780520041806.
- Ngaosyvathn, Mayoury; Ngaosyvathn, Pheuiphanh (2018). Paths to Conflagration: Fifty Years of Diplomacy and Warfare in Laos, Thailand, and Vietnam. Cornell University Press. ISBN 9781501732546.
- Kiernan, Ben (2019). Việt Nam: a history from earliest time to the present. Oxford University Press. ISBN 9780190053796.
- Taylor, Keith W. (2013). A History of the Vietnamese. Cambridge University Press. ISBN 9781107244351.
- Barnes, Thomas J. (2000). Tay Son: Rebellion in 18th Century Vietnam. Xlibris Corporation. ISBN 9780738818184.
- Müller, Leos; Amirell, Stefan Eklöf, eds. (2014). Persistent Piracy: Maritime Violence and State-Formation in Global Historical Perspective. Palgrave Macmillan UK. ISBN 9781349469406.
- Antony, Robert J. (2014), "Maritime Violence and State-Formation in Vietnam: Piracy and the Tay Son Rebellion, 1771–1802", in Müller, Leos; Amirell, Stefan Eklöf (eds.), Persistent Piracy: Maritime Violence and State-Formation in Global Historical Perspective, UK: Palgrave Macmillan UK, ISBN 9781349469406
- Reid, Anthony; Nhung Tuyet, Tran, eds. (2006). Viet Nam: Borderless Histories. Cambridge University Press. ISBN 9781316445044.
- Wilcox, Wynn (2006), "Transnationalism and Multiethnicity in the Early Nguyễn Ánh Gia Long Period", in Reid, Anthony; Tran, Nhung Tuyet (eds.), Viet Nam: Borderless Histories, Cambridge: Cambridge University Press, pp. 194–216, ISBN 9781316445044
- Cœdès, George (1968). Walter F. Vella (ed.). The Indianized States of Southeast Asia. Trans: Susan Brown Cowing. University of Hawaii Press. ISBN 978-0-8248-0368-1.
- Li, Tana (2018). Nguyen Cochinchina: Southern Vietnam in the Seventeenth and Eighteenth Centuries. Cornell University Press. ISBN 9781501732577.
- Kohn, George Childs (1999). Dictionary of Wars (Revised ed.). New York: Facts On File, Inc. ISBN 0-8160-3928-3.
- Ward, Geoffrey C. (2017). Burns, Ken (ed.). The Vietnam War: An Intimate History. Alfred A. Knopf. ISBN 9780307700254.
- Woodside, Alexander (1988). Vietnam and the Chinese model: a comparative study of Vietnamese and Chinese government in the first half of the nineteenth century. Cambridge, Massachusetts: Harvard University Press. ISBN 0-674-93721-X.
- Mantienne, Frédéric (2003). "The Transfer of Western Military Technology to Vietnam in the Late Eighteenth and Early Nineteenth Centuries: The Case of the Nguyễns". Journal of Southeast Asian Studies. 34 (3): 519–534. doi:10.1017/S0022463403000468. S2CID 162778534.
- Dutton, George (2005). "Reassessing Confucianism in the Tây Son Regime (1788–1802)". Journal of Southeast Asian Studies. 13 (2). London: University of London: 157–183. doi:10.5367/0000000054604506. S2CID 147196835.
- Friedland, William H. (1977). "Community and Revolution in Modern Vietnam. Alexander B. Woodside". American Journal of Sociology. 83 (2). Chicago: University of Chicago: 520–521. doi:10.1086/226584.
- Chandler, David P.; Owen, Norman G. (2005). The Emergence of Modern Southeast Asia. University of Hawaii Press. ISBN 0824828909.
- Tucker, Spencer (1999). Vietnam. Lexington: University Press of Kentucky. ISBN 978-0-8131-0966-4.
- Holcombe, Charles (2018). "Dai Viet (Vietnam before the Nineteenth Century)". A History of East Asia. Cambridge: Cambridge University Press. pp. 199–216. doi:10.1017/9781316340356.011. ISBN 9781107118737.
- Clodfelter, Micheal (1995). Vietnam in Military Statistics: A History of the Indochina Wars, 1772–1991. Jefferson: McFarland & Co. ISBN 978-0-7864-0027-0.
- Ooi, Keat Gin, ed. (2004). Southeast Asia: A Historical Encyclopedia, from Angkor Wat to East Timor. ABC-CLIO. ISBN 9781576077719.
- Choi, Byung Wook (2004). Southern Vietnam Under the Reign of Minh Mạng (1820-1841): Central Policies and Local Response. SEAP Publications. ISBN 978-0-87727-138-3.
- Lieberman, Victor B. (2003). Strange Parallels: Southeast Asia in Global Context, c. 800–1830, volume 1, Integration on the Mainland. Cambridge University Press. ISBN 978-0-521-80496-7.
- Wilcox, Wynn (2010). Vietnam and the West: New Approaches. Cornell University, Southeast Asia Program. ISBN 9780877277828.
- McLeod, Mark W. (1991). The Vietnamese response to French intervention, 1862–1874. New York: Praeger. ISBN 0-275-93562-0.
- Wang, Wensheng (2014). White Lotus Rebels and South China Pirates. Harvard University Press. ISBN 9780674727991.
- Andaya, Barbara Watson; Andaya, Leonard Y. (2015). A History of Early Modern Southeast Asia, 1400-1830. Cambridge University Press. ISBN 9780521889926.
- Walker, Hugh Dyson (2012). East Asia: A New History. AuthorHouse. ISBN 978-1477265161.
- Reid, Anthony (2015). A History of Southeast Asia: Critical Crossroads. Wiley. ISBN 9781118512951.
- Hoang, Anh Tuấn (2007). Silk for Silver: Dutch-Vietnamese relations, 1637-1700. Brill. ISBN 978-9-04-742169-6.
- Trần, Khánh (1993). The Ethnic Chinese and Economic Development in Vietnam. Institute of Southeast Asian Studies. ISBN 9789813016668.
- Reid, Anthony, ed. (2018). Southeast Asia in the Early Modern Era: Trade, Power, and Belief. Cornell University Press. ISBN 9781501732171.
- Dutton, George; Werner, Jayne; Whitmore, John K., eds. (2012). Sources of Vietnamese Tradition. Columbia University Press. ISBN 978-0-231-51110-0.
