= Trương Văn Hiến =

Trương Văn Hiến (張文獻, ?–?), also called Giáo Hiến (教獻, lit. "Teacher Hiến"), was a scholar of Revival Lê dynasty.

Born in Nghệ An, he was a retainer of Trương Văn Hạnh. Hạnh was a teacher of Nguyễn Phúc Luân. In 1765, lord Nguyễn Phúc Khoát died, and appointed Luân as successor. But Trương Phúc Loan changed the lord's will and throned Nguyễn Phúc Thuần, the new lord. Luân and his supporters were thrown into prison and killed, including Hạnh.

Trương Văn Hiến had to flee to Quy Nhơn. There, he built a school to teach Confucianism and martial arts. The Tây Sơn brothers, Nguyễn Nhạc, Nguyễn Lữ and Nguyễn Huệ, were his students. He also encouraged the brothers to revolt against Nguyễn lords. Finally, they rebelled in 1771.

His son, Trương Văn Đa, was a general of the Tây Sơn dynasty, and married a daughter of Nguyễn Nhạc.
