= Phạm Ngạn =

Phạm Ngạn (范彥, ?–?) was a general of Tây Sơn dynasty, Vietnam.

Phạm Ngạn was a brother of Phạm Văn Tham and Phạm Công Hưng. He also had a sister Phạm Thị Liên, whom was Nguyễn Huệ's wife.

He was promoted to Hộ Giá ("Protectorate General") by Nguyễn Nhạc. In late 1777, the main part of the Tây Sơn army left Saigon to go north and attack the Trịnh lords. Nguyễn Ánh, the new crowned Nguyễn lord, defeated Tây Sơn army, reoccupied Saigon. Ngạn led a navy to attack Biên Hòa, Saigon and adjacent coastal areas. He was defeated by Nguyễn lord, and had to flee.

In 1781, Đỗ Thanh Nhơn, an important general of Nguyễn lord, was executed by Nguyễn Ánh, which badly weakening the Nguyễn army. In 1782 Nguyễn Nhạc and Nguyễn Huệ recaptured Saigon. During the battles Phạm Ngạn was killed in an ambush at Tham Lương Bridge by the Hoà Nghĩa army. This was military group formed by ethnic Chinese that fought for the Nguyen lords. Nguyễn Nhạc had a close relationship with him (his daughter was married to him) and was angry. According to the Veritable Records of Đại Nam, the official history of the Nguyễn dynasty, thinking that the Hoa Nghia army was full of ethnic Chinese he ordered to capture them in Gia Dinh (Saigon) regardless of whether they were soldiers or civilians.

In Chợ Lớn, goods from Chinese merchants were scattered in the streets. Tens of thousands of people were killed. The town was rebuilt. High embankment were erected and it was renamed Tai-Ngon (embankment).
