= Battle of Rạch Gầm-Xoài Mút =

1785 battle fought in Vietnam between Tây Sơn forces and Siam

Coordinates: 10°20′20″N 106°19′30″E

- Part of Tây Sơn wars and Siamese–Vietnamese Wars
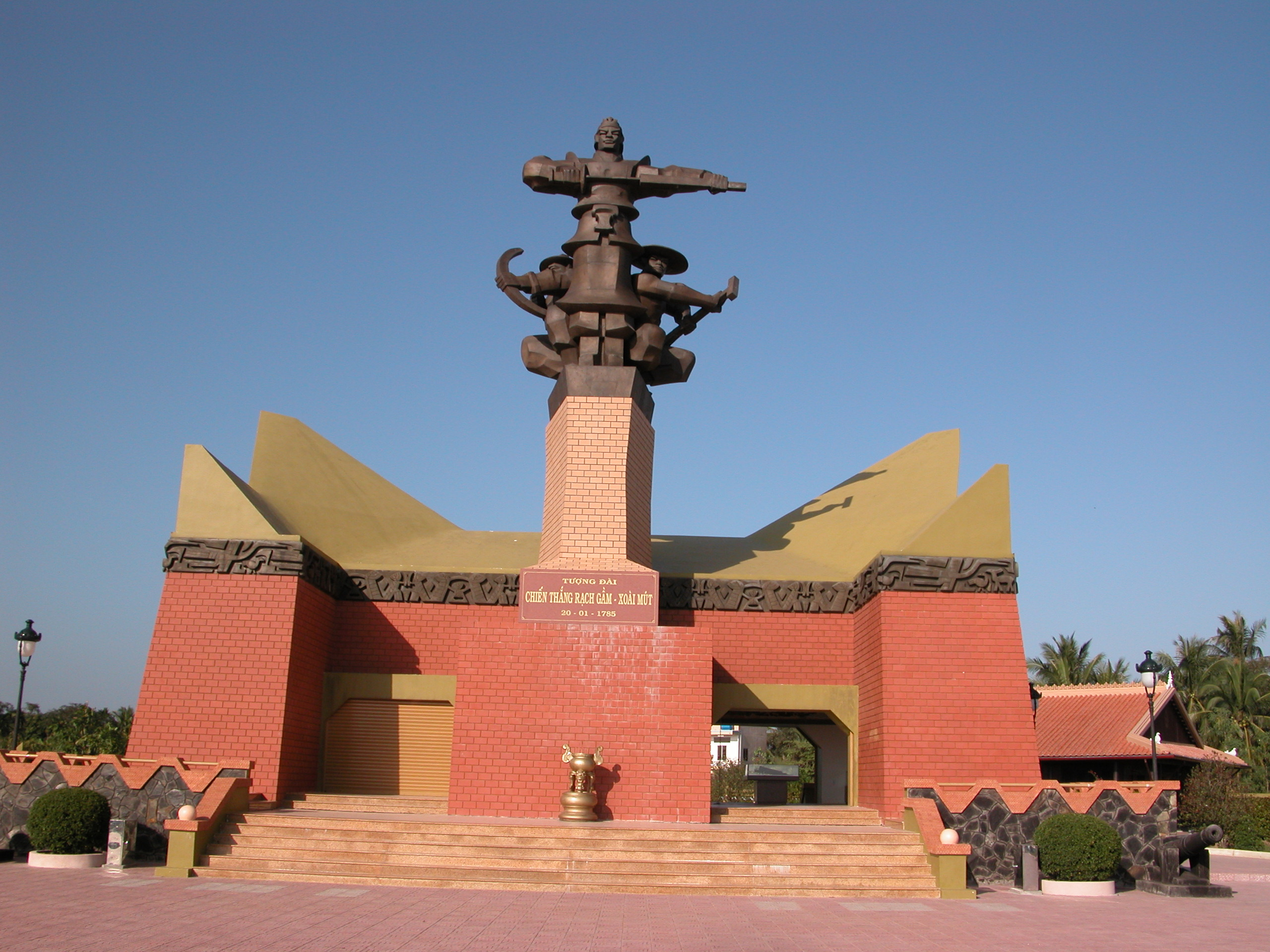
- Vietnamese monument of the battle
Date	1784–1785
Location	Rạch Gầm River and Xoài Mút River (near Mỹ Tho River, in present-day Đồng Tháp Province, southern Vietnam)
Result	Tây Sơn victory.
Territorial changes	Tây Sơn fully annexes Nguyễn territory; Siamese-Cambodian-Nguyễn remnants withdraw back to Siam

Belligerents
Tây Sơn	Rattanakosin Kingdom (Siam); Oudong Kingdom; Nguyễn lords Hà Tiên Protectorate

Commanders and leaders
Nguyễn Huệ (Note: The Tây Sơn brothers were referred to as Ong Yak (องอยาก), Ong Bai (องบาย) and Ong Dam (องดาม) in Siamese royal records respectively. Siamese records confused Nguyễn Huệ with Nguyễn Lữ.); Nguyễn Lữ; Trương Văn Đa; Đặng Văn Trấn; Bùi Thị Xuân; Trần Quang Diệu; Võ Văn Dũng	Krom Luang Thepharirak (Chiêu Tăng); Phraya Wichitnarong (Chiêu Sương); Phraya Thatsada (Thạt Xỉ Đa); Chaophraya Aphaiphubet (Chiêu Thùy Biện) (Note: Siamese and Cambodian generals who got involved in the battle were referred to as Chiêu Tăng (昭曾), Chiêu Sương (昭霜), Lục Côn (六昆), Sa Uyển (沙苑), Chiêu Thùy Biện (昭錘卞) and Thát Xỉ Đa (撻齒多) in historical records of Vietnam. Lục Côn and Sa Uyển are unknown in Siamese texts.); Nguyễn Ánh (Note: Nguyễn Ánh was referred to as Ong Chiang Su (Thai: องเชียงสือ RTGS: Ong Chiang Sue) in Siamese royal records; Ong Chiang Su derived from the Vietnamese word Ông thượng thư ("Sir chief of staff")); Lê Văn Duyệt; Lê Văn Quân; Nguyễn Văn Thành; Nguyễn Văn Oai †; Mạc Tử Sinh

Units involved
Tây Sơn Army	Siamese Army; Siamese Navy; Nguyễn Ánh's forces

Strength
30,000 men 55 warships 100 sailing ships 300 small canoes 132 cannons Total: 30,000+	Siamese-Cambodian: 40,000 sailors 30,000 infantry 300 warships 3,000–4,000 Nguyễn Ánh's forces Total: 73,000+

Casualties and losses
Unknown, but less than opponent	Warships: near annihilation Siamese–Cambodian troops: number of dead uncertain Vietnamese Claim: 40,000 Siamese Troops Killed; Nguyễn forces: c. 3,200 killed

The Battle of Rạch Gầm-Xoài Mút (Vietnamese: Trận Rạch Gầm – Xoài Mút, Thai: การรบที่ซากเกิ่ม-สว่ายมุต) was fought between the Vietnamese Tây Sơn forces and an army of Siam in present-day Kim Sơn commune, Đồng Tháp province of Vietnam on 20 January 1785.

== Background ==
In the late 18th century, a rebellion broke out in southern Vietnam. The Nguyễn lords, the hereditary rulers in southern Vietnam, were overthrown by the Tây Sơn brothers: Nguyễn Nhạc, Nguyễn Huệ and Nguyễn Lữ in 1777. With the help of supporters, Nguyễn Ánh, a nephew of the last Nguyễn lord, reconquered Gia Định (present day Hồ Chí Minh City) as Đại nguyên súy Nhiếp quốc chính ("Commander in chief and regent") and later proclaimed himself Nguyễn Vương ("Nguyễn king").

In 1783 the Tây Sơn rebel forces recaptured Gia Định. Nguyễn Ánh had to flee to Phú Quốc island, while his army was attacked and defeated by a Tây Sơn army. One of Ánh's generals, Châu Văn Tiếp, was sent to Siam to make a request for aid. According to Vietnamese records, an army under the Siamese general Thát Xỉ Đa (撻齒多, also known as Chất Si Đa) arrived in Hà Tiên the next year. Nguyễn Ánh retreated to Siam with him, where they met king Rama I, who promised that Siam would support Ánh's struggle for dominance in Vietnam.

There was an episode only mentioned in the Royal Thai Chronicles. In 1783, a Siamese army under Phraya Nakhonsawan (พระยานครสวรรค์) had marched to Cambodia to come to the aid of Nguyễn Ánh. There they clashed with Vietnamese forces of Ong Tin Wuang (องติเวือง, Nguyễn Lữ) in Sadec (Sa Đéc) and captured warships, prisoners and various types of weapons, yet later returned them to the Tay Son. A number of generals, Phraya Wichitnarong (พระยาวิชิตณรงค์) among them, disapproved the decision and secretly reported to Bangkok. Charged with treason, Phraya Nakhonsawan and 12 men were executed in the graveyard of Photharam Temple in Ayutthaya.

== Siamese invasion ==
Nguyễn Ánh and the Siamese planned a decisive attack on the Tay Son. According to Vietnamese records, in April 1784, an army of 30,000 troops under the Siamese generals Lục Côn and Sa Uyển was dispatched to Cambodia and prepare to attack Gia Dinh. Another force under the Cambodian minister Chiêu Thùy Biện also prepared for battle. On 25 July a Siamese fleet of 300 warships and 20,000 men sailed for Gia Dinh. The contingent was led by senior commanders of the fleet, Chiêu Tăng, a nephew of the Siamese king, as the chief commander and Chiêu Sương, as the vanguard.

According to the Royal Thai Chronicles, in March 1784, a fleet with five thousand men under Chao Fa Krom Luang Thepharirak was dispatched to attack and recapture Saigon for Nguyễn Ánh. Phraya Wichitnarong lead the Siamese infantry to Cambodia and took command of the Cambodian army. Chaophraya Aphaiphubet recruited another five thousand soldiers to join the Siamese troops.

The Siamese-Cambodian infantry contingents under Phraya Wichitnarong attacked Sa Đéc (Piamchopsadaek), where they defeated several Tay Son detachments. Phraya Wichitnarong then marched toward to Ba Lai (Piambarai) and attacked a Tay Son army in Ban Payung (Ba Giồng).

Meanwhile, the Siamese-Nguyễn fleet under Krom Luang Thepharirak and Nguyễn Ánh finally landed in Banteay Meas (Mang Khảm, a place belonging to Hà Tiên during that time). There, an army under Phraya Rachasethi (Mạc Tử Sinh) and Phraya Thatsada (พระยาทัศดา) was to reinforce them. The Siamese-Nguyễn fleet sailed to the Bassac River (sông Hậu in Vietnamese) and stopped in Trà Tân (Wamanao, a place near Mỹ Tho).

After several victories, the Siamese generals began to look down upon the Tây Sơn army and treat Nguyễn Ánh without respect. Siamese soldiers committed atrocities against Vietnamese settlers. In a letter to French preacher J. Liot, Nguyễn Ánh complained about the Siamese atrocities, who robbed, raped and slaughtered unscrupulously. As a consequence, local farmers turned to support the Tây Sơn.

However, the Siamese invaders met increasing resistance from the Tây Sơn army. Trương Văn Đa fought bravely against the Siamese invaders. On 30 November, he defeated the Siamese-Nguyễn fleet, killed Châu Văn Tiếp (the highest commander of the Nguyễn fleet) and wounded the Siamese general Thát Xỉ Đa at the Mân Thít River. Lê Văn Quân succeeded Tiếp as the highest commander of the Nguyễn fleet.

By the end of 1784, the Siamese had taken Rạch Giá, Trấn Giang (Cần Thơ), Ba Thắc (Srok Pra-sak, Sóc Trăng), Trà Ôn, Sa Đéc, Mân Thít (or Mang thít, Man Thiết), and controlled Hà Tiên, An Giang and Vĩnh Long. But important places, including Mỹ Tho and Gia Định, were still controlled by the Tây Sơn army. Realizing he was unable to repulse the enemy, Trương Văn Đa sent Đặng Văn Trấn to Quy Nhơn for help.

== Battle ==
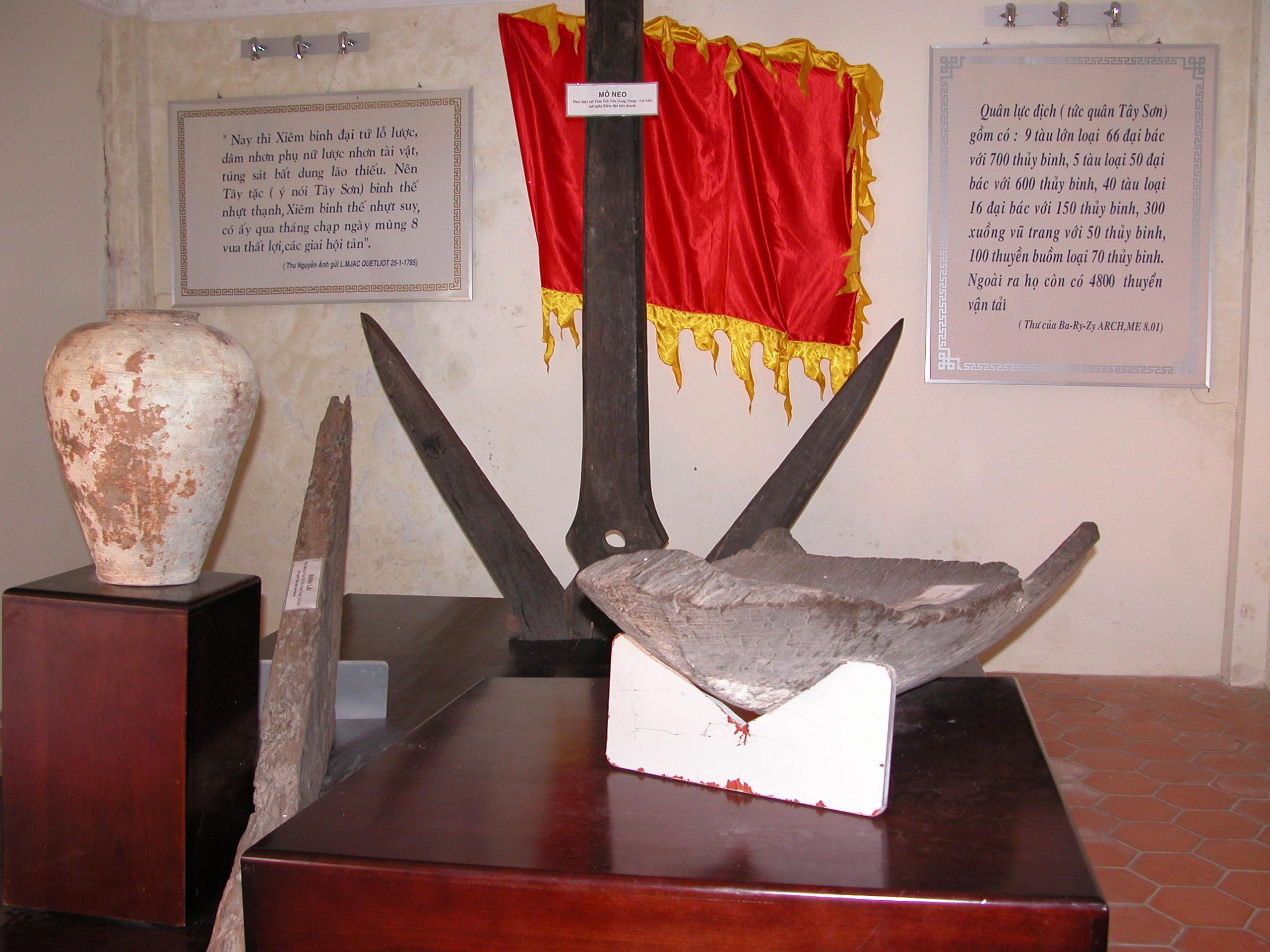
Weapon remains from the battle

The Tây Sơn reinforcements led by Nguyễn Huệ marched south from Quy Nhon and arrived in Cochinchina territory around January 1785. Huệ set up his headquarter in Mỹ Tho, not far from Trà Tân, the headquarter of the Siamese troops.

Small groups of Tây Sơn navy harassed Siamese fortified points during high tide and withdrew during low tide. They gathered intelligence about the Siamese navy and pretended to be vulnerable. After many victories, the Siamese army and naval forces were overconfident. Nguyễn Huệ noticed it, and decided to avoid a direct attack on a strong Siamese force. He sent a small naval force, under a banner of truce, to offer to parley with the Siamese. Huệ gave many treasures to Krom Luang Thepharirak (Chiêu Tăng), and requested him not to support Nguyễn Ánh. Huệ also promised that the Tây Sơn would pay tribute to Siam. Thepharirak received these presents.

During the negotiations, Siamese soldiers were invited to visit the warships of the Tây Sơn navy. Nguyễn Huệ showed sophisticated weapons to them, and gave them many treasures before they returned. Hearing that, Nguyễn Ánh suspected the Siamese to have sinister intentions. Thepharirak had to explain to Nguyễn Ánh that it was just a stratagem.

Thepharirak was confident that Nguyễn Huệ was waiting for the results of negotiations, because he saw Tây Sơn warships withdrawing to Mỹ Tho orderly. Thepharirak planned a surprise attack on the Tây Sơn navy. The date was fixed on 19 January 1785 (9 December of the year Giáp Thìn in Vietnamese lunar calendar), and notified Nguyễn Ánh. Ánh had a presentiment that the Siamese navy would be defeated. He sent Mạc Tử Sinh to Trấn Giang (Cần Thơ) to prepare a boat, which would facilitate flight in case of defeat.

However, Thepharirak was overconfident, actually it was a trap set up by Huệ. Nguyễn Huệ, anticipating a move from the Siamese, had secretly positioned his infantry and artillery along the Mekong river (Rạch Gầm-Xoài Mút area of present-day Tiền Giang province), and on some islands in the middle, facing other troops on the northern banks with naval reinforcements on both sides of the infantry positions.

On the morning of 20 January 1785, Chiêu Tăng (Thepharirak) and the Siamese main forces left Trà Tân to attack Mỹ Tho, where Hue's headquarter was located. Only a small group of infantry led by Sa Uyển was left in Sa Đéc. The navy of the Nguyễn lord led by Lê Văn Quân was ordered to take the lead. When the front navy reached Rạch Gầm River, and the rear navy reached Xoài Mút River, Nguyễn Huệ's ships dashed into the unprepared Siamese troops, preventing their advance or retreat. In the meanwhile, the Tây Sơn artillery opened fire. One of the secret weapons of the Tây Sơn force was the Hỏa Hổ Thần Công (Flaming Tiger Cannon), which could release a stream of fire at a very long range.

The battle ended with a near annihilation of the Siamese force, as according to Vietnamese sources all the ships of the Siamese navy were destroyed. Chiêu Tăng (Thepharirak) and Chiêu Sương landed in the north bank of Mỹ Tho River, then at Quang Hóa, through Cambodia, and arrived in Bangkok in March 1785. Only 2,000 to 3,000 men of the original expedition escaped. Other survivors stole the boats of civilians and fled to Cambodia. On 4 February 1785, Rama I received the information that the Siamese navy was defeated. He sent a dozen ships to rescue Siamese soldiers. There were only ten thousand survivors.

When his navy was nearly annihilated Nguyễn Ánh and a dozen men escaped to Trấn Giang (Cần Thơ) where they met Mạc Tử Sinh and went to Hà Tiên on three ships. In Hà Tiên, Nguyễn Ánh gathered the remnants of his navy and fled to Poulo Panjang, then to Ko Kut and finally arrived in Bangkok, where he sought refuge until August 1787.

== See also ==
- Tây Sơn dynasty
- Tây Sơn military tactics and organization
- Battle of Ngọc Hồi-Đống Đa
- Feigned retreat

== Notes ==
Footnotes

Citations
