= Phạm Văn Tham =

Vietnamese general of Tây Sơn dynasty

Phạm Văn Tham (范文參, ?–1789) or Phạm Văn Sâm, was a general of Tây Sơn dynasty, Vietnam.

Phạm Văn Tham was an elder brother of Phạm Ngạn and Phạm Công Hưng. He also had a sister Phạm Thị Liên, whom was Nguyễn Huệ's wife.

Tham joined the Tây Sơn army in early time. He was promoted to Thái bảo ("Grand Protector"), and participated in many battles against Nguyễn lords. He killed Dương Công Trừng and Nguyễn Đăng Vân in action, and defeated Tôn Thất Huy, Tôn Thất Hội.

In 1787, Nguyễn Ánh returned to Vietnam and landed in Long Xuyên. Getting the information, Nguyễn Lữ was afraid, and retreated to Biên Hòa, leaving Tham to defend Gia Định. Nguyễn Ánh forged a letter from Nguyễn Nhạc to Nguyễn Lữ, and sent it to Tham. In the letter, Nhạc described Tham as an overbearing man, and ordered Lữ to kill Tham. After receiving the letter, Tham marched to Biên Hòa, with a white flag in front of the army, to justify his wrongful treatment. But the white flag was mistaken for his surrender to Nguyễn lord, Nguyễn Lữ abandoned his troops and fled to Quy Nhơn.

Tham had to fight alone. He defeated Nguyễn Ánh in Gia Định, and forced Nguyễn Ánh to retreat to Mỹ Tho. The next year, in 1788, Võ Tánh, a general of Đông Sơn army, decided to join Nguyễn lord's side. The tables were turned; Tham was defeated and fled to Ba Thắc. In 1789, he decided to break through the encirclement and flee to Quy Nhơn by ship, but was defeated and besieged by Lê Văn Quân, Tôn Thất Hội, Võ Tánh and Nguyễn Văn Trương. He had to surrender to Nguyễn lord, which marked the end of Tây Sơn rule in Gia Định. Not long after, he colluded with Nguyễn Huệ, and planned to revolt against Nguyễn lord. The plot was uncovered, and he was executed.
