= Quang Trung Museum =

- Bảo tàng Quang Trung
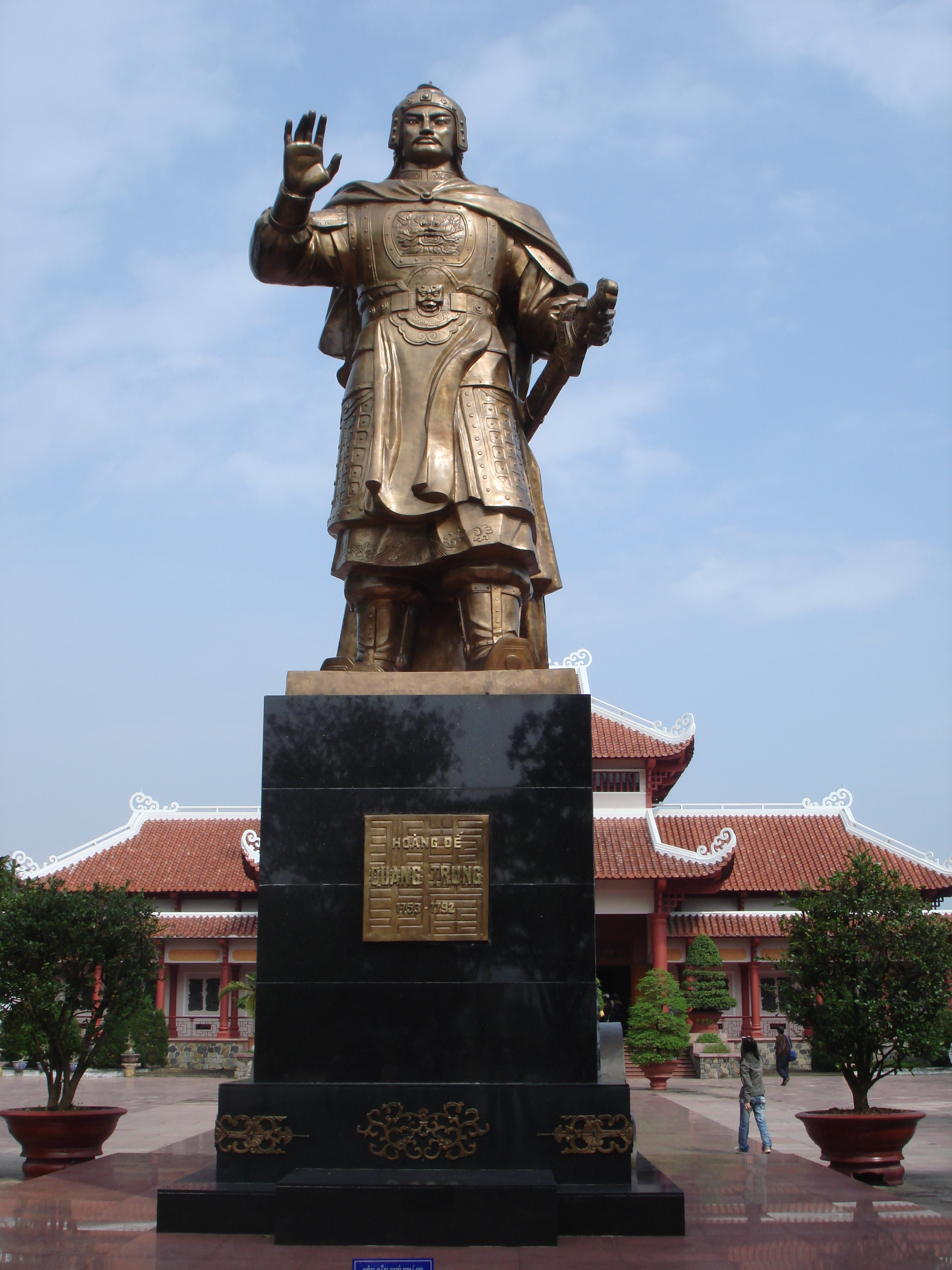
- The Emperor Quang Trung statue at the Quang Trung Museum.
- Established: 25 November 1979
- Location: Tây Sơn District, Gia Lai Province, Vietnam
- Type: History museum

The Quang Trung Museum (Vietnamese: Bảo tàng Quang Trung) is a history museum in Gia Lai Province, Vietnam, dedicated to commemorating Emperor Quang Trung (Nguyễn Huệ) and the Tây Sơn dynasty. Located on the site of the former family home of the Tây Sơn brothers (Nguyễn Nhạc, Nguyễn Lữ, and Nguyễn Huệ) the museum preserves artifacts from the Tây Sơn uprising and serves as a key cultural and historical site. It encompasses the Tây Sơn Tam Kiệt Temple (also known as Điện Tây Sơn) and covers an area of 150,000 square meters. Established in 1979, it was designated a special national monument in 2014.

== History ==
=== Early origins ===
The Tây Sơn brothers originated from the village of Tây Sơn but settled in Kiên Mỹ (now part of Phú Phong town), where they engaged in trade and agriculture. This area became the base for the Tây Sơn uprising, which overthrew the Nguyễn and Trịnh lords and repelled invasions from Siam and the Qing dynasty. After the fall of the Tây Sơn dynasty in 1802, the succeeding Nguyễn dynasty suppressed worship of the brothers, destroying their ancestral shrines.

In 1823, villagers secretly built the Kiên Mỹ Village Temple (Đình làng Kiên Mỹ) on the site of the destroyed ancestral hall, ostensibly to honor the village deity but actually to venerate the three brothers. This structure, later known as the Tây Sơn Tam Kiệt Temple, was destroyed by French forces in 1946 and rebuilt in 1958–1960.

=== Museum establishment ===
Following Vietnam's reunification in 1975, the government approved the construction of the Quang Trung Museum. Work began on 11 December 1977 and was completed on 25 November 1979. The museum complex includes performance halls for Tây Sơn music and martial arts, a Tây Nguyên longhouse, and expanded grounds reaching the Côn River by 2007.

In 1998-1999, the temple was rebuilt on a larger scale, featuring bronze statues of the brothers and their generals. Further upgrades occurred in 2015, with investments exceeding 200 billion VND, and a 40th anniversary celebration in 2019.

The site was recognized as a national historical and cultural relic in 1979 and elevated to special national monument status on 31 December 2014.

== Exhibits and architecture ==
The museum houses over 11,000 artifacts from the Tây Sơn era and the reign of Emperor Quang Trung, including weapons, coins, seals, and genealogical records. The display hall, expanded in 2019, features ten rooms chronicling the Tây Sơn movement from its origins to its legacy.

Key features include:

- The Tây Sơn Tam Kiệt Temple (Điện Tây Sơn): A traditional structure with altars to the three brothers and bronze statues added in 1999 and 2004.
- A 300-year-old tamarind tree and ancient well from the Tây Sơn family home, recognized as Vietnamese heritage in 2011.
- Performance hall for Tây Sơn martial arts and music, and a Tây Nguyên longhouse displaying ethnic minority cultures.
- Statue of Emperor Quang Trung as the centerpiece.

The museum also holds donated artifacts, such as 21 Tây Sơn-era iron swords received in 2011.

== Significance ==
As one of Vietnam's most visited historical museums, it attracts tourists and researchers interested in the Tây Sơn period. Annual events include festivals commemorating victories like Ngọc Hồi-Đống Đa, drawing thousands of visitors during Lunar New Year.
