= Đặng Văn Chân =

Vietnamese admiral of the Tây Sơn dynasty

Đặng Văn Chân (鄧文真, ?–?), or Đặng Văn Trấn (鄧文鎮), was an admiral of the Tây Sơn dynasty, Vietnam.

Chân was an admiral, his position was Đô úy thủy quân ("Navy Commandant"). He attacked Gia Định (modern Ho Chi Minh City) several times. After the captured of Gia Định, he was left there to assist Trương Văn Đa. In 1785, Siamese forces invaded Gia Định, he was sent to Quy Nhơn for help. He joined the Battle of Rạch Gầm-Xoài Mút, and defeated Siamese forces. Nguyễn Huệ retreated from Cochinchina, and left Chân in Gia Định.

A civil war broke out between Nguyễn Nhạc and Nguyễn Huệ in 1787, he joined Nhạc's side. Huệ besieged Quy Nhơn, he led the main forces to support Nhạc. Getting the information, Nguyễn Ánh returned to Vietnam. Chân was defeated and captured by Huệ, and later surrendered to Huệ. After the Battle of Ngọc Hồi-Đống Đa, Huệ attempted to find a peaceful solution with Qing China. Chân was sent to China as a member of the diplomatic corps.

Quy Nhơn was attacked by Nguyễn lord in 1793. Nguyễn Nhạc was defeated, and asked for Toản's help. An army under Phạm Công Hưng, Ngô Văn Sở, Nguyễn Văn Huấn and Lê Trung was sent to reinforce Quy Nhơn. In the same time, Chân led 50 ships to assist them. They forced Nguyễn army to retreat.
