= Quang Trung =

2nd emperor of the Tây Sơn dynasty of Vietnam (r. 1788–92)

Emperor Quang Trung 光中帝
- Emperor of Đại Việt
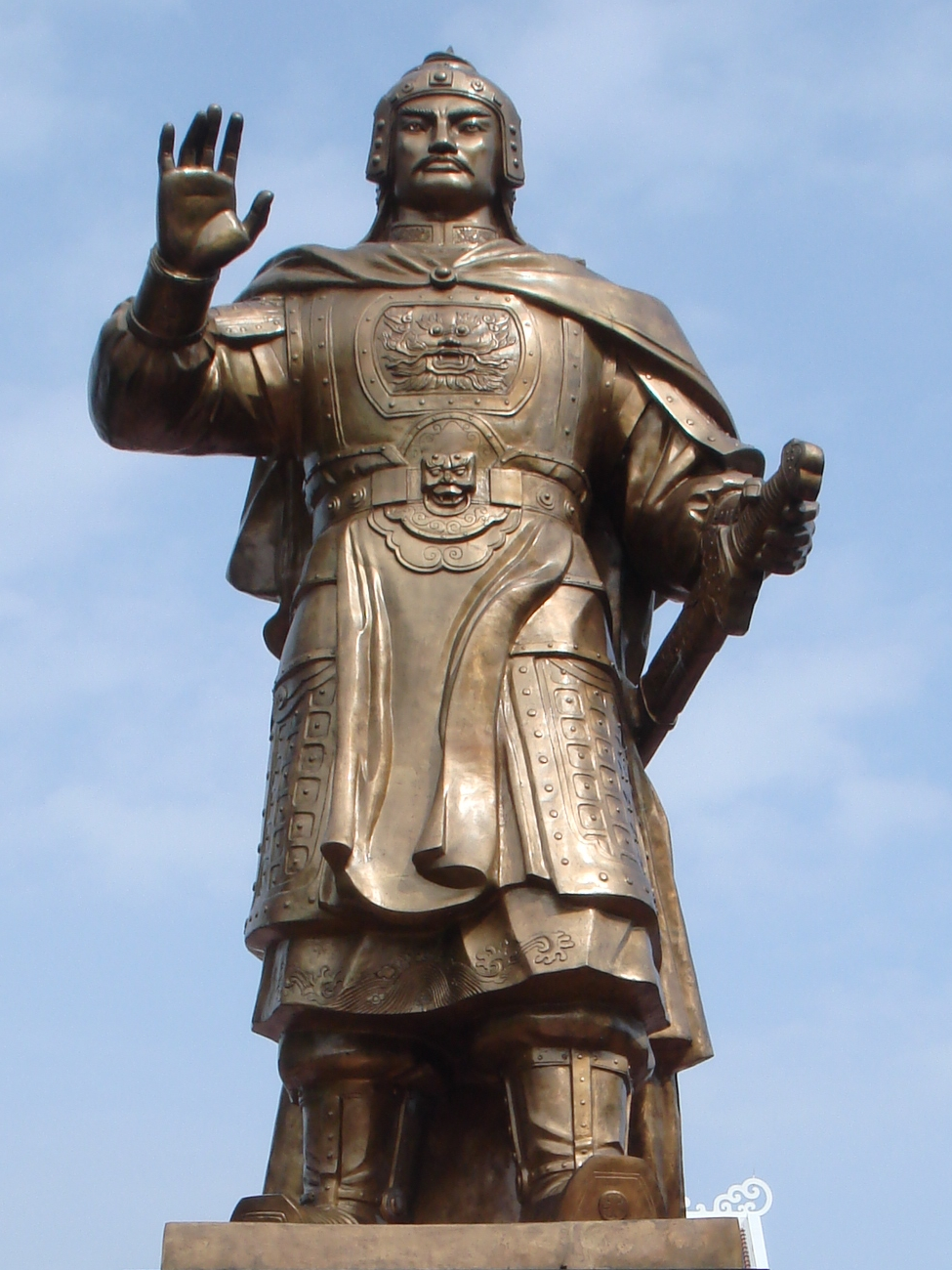
- Statue of Emperor Quang Trung at the Quang Trung Museum, Tây Sơn district, Bình Định province

Emperor of Tây Sơn dynasty
- Reign: 1788–1792
- Coronation: 22 December 1788; Bân Hill, Phú Xuân
- Predecessor: Emperor Thái Đức
- Successor: Emperor Cảnh Thịnh
- Born: 1753; Bình Định, Đàng Trong, Đại Việt
- Died: 16 September 1792 (aged 38–39); Phú Xuân, Đại Việt
- Spouse: Phạm Thị Liên; Bùi Thị Nhạn; Lê Ngọc Hân; Lê Thị; Trần Thị Quỵ; Nguyễn Thị Bích
- Issue: see list: Nguyễn Quang Toản; Nguyễn Quang Bàn; Nguyễn Quang Thiệu; Nguyễn Quang Khanh; Nguyễn Quang Đức; Nguyễn Quang Thùy; Nguyễn Quang Cương; Nguyễn Quang Tự; Nguyễn Quang Điện; Nguyễn Thất; Nguyễn Quốc Duy; nine daughters
Names
- Hồ Thơm (胡𦹳); Nguyễn Huệ (阮惠); Nguyễn Văn Huệ (阮文惠); Nguyễn Quang Bình (阮光平)
Era name and dates
- Quang Trung (光中): 1788–1792
Posthumous name
- Vũ Hoàng đế (武皇帝)
Temple name
- Thái Tổ (太祖)
- House: Tây Sơn dynasty
- Father: Hồ Phi Phúc (or Nguyễn Phi Phúc)
- Mother: Nguyễn Thị Đồng

Emperor Quang Trung (Vietnamese: [kwāːŋ ʈūŋm]; chữ Hán: 光中, 1753 – 16 September 1792) or Nguyễn Huệ (chữ Hán: 阮惠), also known as Nguyễn Quang Bình (chữ Hán: 阮光平), or Hồ Thơm (chữ Hán: 胡𦹳) was the second emperor of the Tây Sơn dynasty, reigning from 1788 until 1792. He was also one of the most successful military commanders in Vietnam's history. Nguyễn Huệ and his brothers, Nguyễn Nhạc and Nguyễn Lữ, together known as the Tây Sơn brothers, were the leaders of the Tây Sơn rebellion. As rebels, they conquered Vietnam, overthrowing the imperial Later Lê dynasty and the two rival feudal houses of the Nguyễn in the south and the Trịnh in the north.

After several years of constant military campaigning and rule, Nguyễn Huệ died at the age of 40. Prior to his death, he had made plans to continue his march southwards in order to destroy the army of Nguyễn Ánh, a surviving heir of the Nguyễn lords.

Nguyễn Huệ's death marked the beginning of the downfall of the Tây Sơn dynasty. His successors were unable to implement the plans he had made for ruling Vietnam, leaving the empire weak and vulnerable. The Tây Sơn dynasty was overthrown by its enemy, Nguyễn Ánh, who established the imperial Nguyễn dynasty in 1802.

== Early life ==
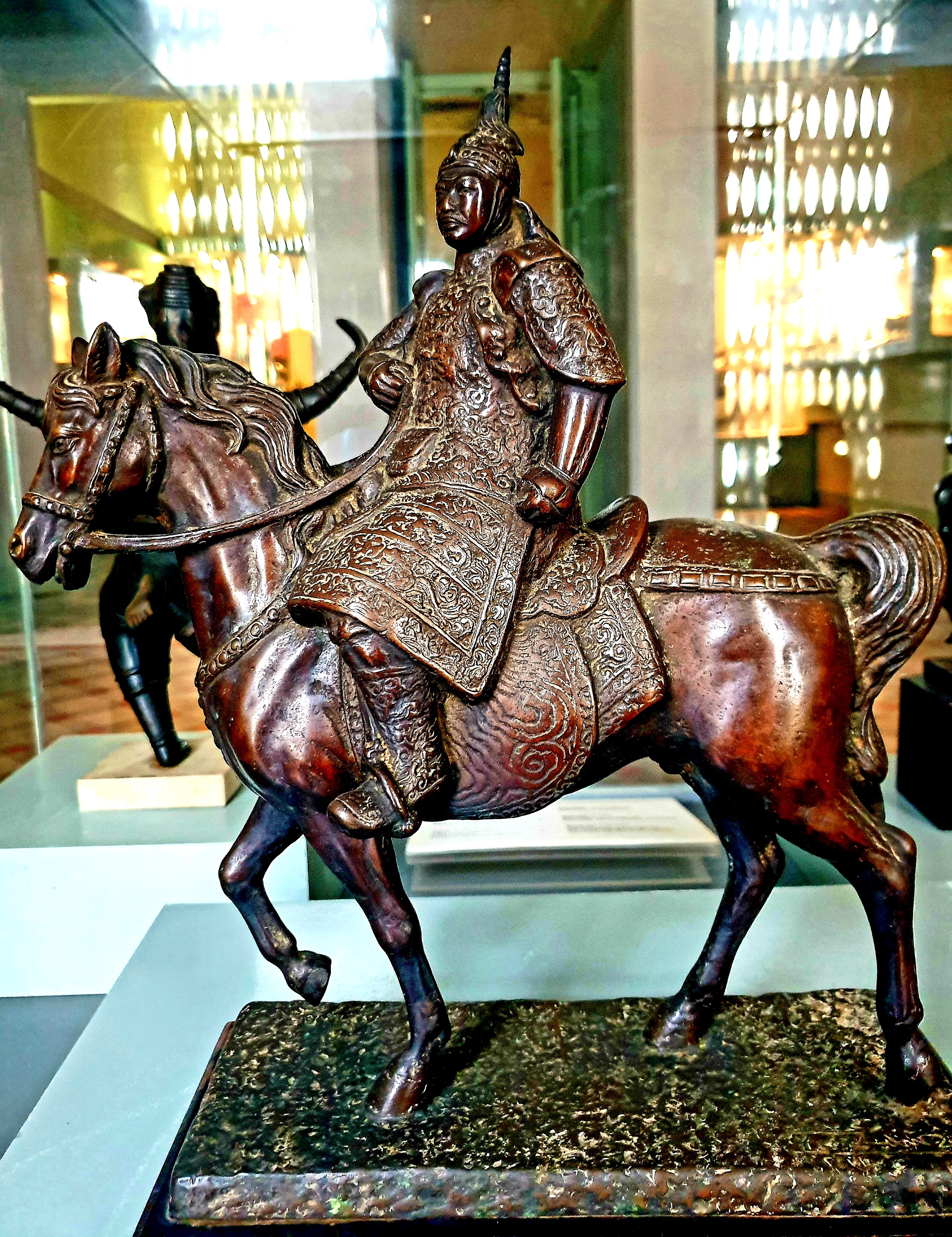
Bronze statue of Emperor Quang Trung

According to multiple sources, Nguyễn Huệ's ancestors were peasants who lived in Nghệ An. They left Nghệ An and moved to southern Vietnam after an attack by the Nguyễn lords against the Trịnh lords in Nghệ An. His ancestors' surname was Hồ (胡), but Huệ's great-grandfather Hồ Phi Long, who was a servant of the Dinh family of Bằng Chân hamlet, Tuy Viễn district (or An Nhơn), Quy Nhơn province, married a woman from the Dinh family and had a son named Hồ Phi Tiễn, Huệ's grandfather. Hồ Phi Tiễn did not continue farming as his father, but instead traded in betel. Through his work he met and married Nguyễn Thị Đồng (阮氏仝), the only daughter of a rich betel tradesman residing in Tây Sơn village. One of their children was Huệ's father Hồ Phi Phúc (胡丕福, also known as Nguyễn Phi Phúc). Some sources say that in taking on the surname Nguyễn, the family followed the surname of Huệ's mother; other sources say that it followed the surname of Nguyễn lords of southern Vietnam.

Nguyễn Huệ was born in 1753 in Tây Sơn village, Quy Nhơn Province (now Bình Định Province). His father had eight children; later, three of them took part in the Tây Sơn Rebellion. According to Đại Nam chính biên liệt truyện, the Tây Sơn brothers, listed from eldest to youngest, were Nguyễn Nhạc, Nguyễn Lữ, Nguyễn Huệ. However, other source reported that Nguyễn Lữ was the youngest one. His birth name was Hồ Thơm, he also had a nickname Đức ông Tám (Sir Eighth the virtue).

Đại Nam chính biên liệt truyện described Nguyễn Huệ as "a cunning man, good at fighting; he has bright penetrating eyes, and always speak in a stentorian voice, everyone fears him." His father, Nguyễn Phi Phúc, made the three brothers dedicate themselves to their studies early in life. Their martial arts master was Trương Văn Hiến, a retainer (môn khách) and friend of Trương Văn Hạnh (張文幸), who in turn was the teacher of Nguyễn Phúc Luân, the father of Nguyễn Ánh. After Trương Văn Hạnh was killed by the powerful chancellor Trương Phúc Loan, Trương Văn Hiến fled to Bình Định. He was first man to discover the talents of the Tây Sơn brothers and to advise them to do great deeds.

Later, Trương Văn Hiến encouraged Nguyễn Nhạc to revolt against Nguyễn lords: "The prophecy says: 'Revolt in the West, success in the North'. (Note: Original Vietnamese: "Tây khởi nghĩa, Bắc thu công".) You are born in Tây Sơn District, you must do your best." Nguyễn Nhạc then gathered people to help him in his rebellion, saying to "overthrow the Trịnh lords, revive the Lê dynasty". (Note: Original Vietnamese: "Phù Lê diệt Trịnh".)

Seeking to overthrow the corrupted Trương Phúc Loan and to help the prince Nguyễn Phúc Dương, the eldest of the Tây Sơn Brothers, Nguyễn Nhạc, gathered an army and revolted in 1771. He was aided by his brothers Nguyễn Huệ and Nguyễn Lữ. In the early days of the rebellion, Huệ was the most helpful of Nhạc's generals both in finance and in training the army; with the encouragement of Trương Văn Hiến and his own talent, Huệ rapidly increased his own popularity and that of the Tây Sơn Rebellion.

Due to its popularity, the Tây Sơn army grew strong and attracted many talented generals, including Nguyễn Thung, Bùi Thị Xuân, Võ Văn Dũng, Võ Đình Tú, Trần Quang Diệu, Trương Mỹ Ngọc, and Võ Xuân Hoài. The rebels became famous for their policy: "fair, no corruption, only looting the rich, and help the poor" (công bằng, không tham nhũng, và chỉ cướp của của người giàu, giúp người nghèo).

== Tây Sơn rebellion ==
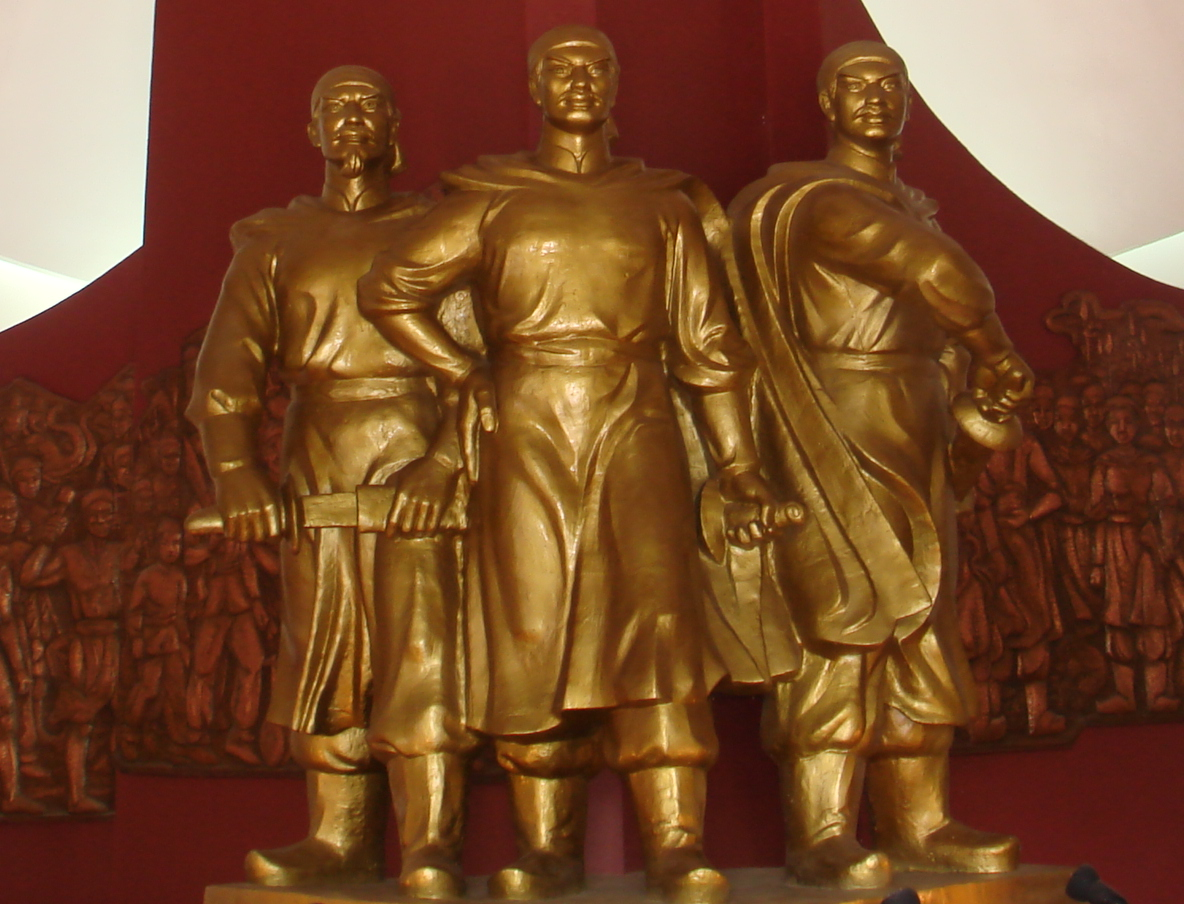
A bronze statue of Tây Sơn Brothers (Nguyễn Nhạc, Nguyễn Lữ and Nguyễn Huệ)

After 200 years of holding power in southern Vietnam, the government of the Nguyễn Lords had become progressively weaker, due to its poor leadership and internal conflicts. Following the death of Lord Nguyễn Phúc Khoát, the powerful official Trương Phúc Loan began to arrogate to himself control over the Nguyễn government. For the purpose of resisting against the excessive power of Trương Phúc Loan and coming to the assistance of Prince Nguyễn Phúc Dương, the Tây Sơn Brothers gathered an army and revolted against the government of the Nguyễn Lords. The rebel army of the Tây Sơn quickly occupied the central part of Nguyễn's territory covering from Quy Nhơn to Bình Thuận, thereby weakening the authority of the Nguyễn government.

In 1774, the government of the Nguyễn lords sent a large army led by general Tống Phước Hiệp against the Tây Sơn rebels. From Gia Định, the troops marched to northern central Vietnam, and after several battles they recaptured Bình Thuận, Diên Khánh, and Bình Khang (modern Ninh Hòa). The rebel army of the Tây Sơn now only held the land from Phú Yên to Quảng Ngãi.

Also in 1774, the ruler of northern Vietnam, Trịnh Sâm, sent a massive army of 30,000 soldiers led by general Hoàng Ngũ Phúc southwards with the same purpose as that of the Tây Sơn rebel army, namely to help the Nguyễn Lords fight Trương Phúc Loan. The northern troops were unobstructed in their march to Phú Xuân, the governmental capital of the Nguyễn Lords. The government of the Nguyễn Lords feared the beginning of an unmanageable war on two fronts. Officials of the government arrested Trương Phúc Loan and gave him up to the troops of the Trịnh Lords. The Trịnh lords, however, continued attacking Phú Xuân under the pretext of helping the Nguyễn Lords suppress the Tây Sơn rebellion. The Nguyễn Lord Nguyễn Phúc Thuần and his officials initially attempted to resist the attack, but ended up fleeing to Quảng Nam.

Seizing the opportunity, Nguyễn Nhạc led an army (with naval support from Chinese pirates) against Nguyễn lords. Once again, the Nguyễn Lord Nguyễn Phúc Thuần fled, this time by sea to Gia Dinh, accompanied by Nguyễn Phúc Ánh, and leaving behind his nephew Nguyễn Phúc Dương. Early in 1775, the army of the Trịnh Lords marched on Quảng Nam at the same time as the Tây Sơn troops reached Quảng Nam. Tây Sơn troops searched for and then captured Nguyễn Phúc Dương. The army of the Trịnh Lords crossed the Hải Vân Pass, engaged the Tây Sơn troops, and defeated them.

At the same time, the general of the Nguyễn lords Tống Phước Hiệp (宋福洽) led his troops against Phú Yên, forcing the Tây Sơn army to withdraw.

Fearing a war on two fronts, Nguyễn Nhạc sent Hoàng Ngũ Phúc a proposal that if the Trịnh lords recognized the Tây Sơn Rebel Army, the Tây Sơn would help the Trịnh lords fight against the Nguyễn Lords. The proposal was accepted, and Nguyễn Nhạc was made an official of the Trịnh lords. Nhac also made peace with the Nguyễn lords, causing Tống Phước Hiệp to take off the pressure, and deluded Prince Nguyễn Phúc Dương. His diplomacy provisionally made Tây Sơn's enemies inactive and bought him valuable time to shore up his army.

Recognizing that the temporary ceasefire was unlikely to endure, Nguyễn Nhạc retrained the rebel army, recruited new soldiers, fortified Đồ Bàn fortress, and built new bases, preparing for an attack.

Tống Phước Hiệp, who had been deceived by Nguyễn Nhạc peaceful overtures, did not pay much attention to Nhạc's activities. He did not prepare for either defending or attacking. Nhạc made use of Hiệp's inactivity, and sent troops led by his brother Nguyễn Huệ against him. The Tây Sơn troops swiftly defeated the unprepared troops of the Nguyễn Lords and inflicted heavy losses upon them. Tống Phước Hiệp and his troops fled to Van Phong. It was the first great victory achieved by Huệ. Nhạc sent news of the victory to Hoàng Ngũ Phúc. On Phúc's request, the Trinh rewarded Nhạc with a new office.

== Overthrow of Nguyễn Lord ==
Because the troops of the Trịnh Lords lacked familiarity with the southern country, Hoàng Ngũ Phúc withdrew the troops to the north. En route, he died of natural causes. Phúc's death marked the end of the Trịnh Lords' interventions in the south. While the army of the Trịnh Lords withdrew to Thuận Hóa, Tây Sơn moved quickly in sending its troops to take over the abandoned territory and to suppress elements loyal to the Nguyễn Lords.

Having gained a lot of new rich land without facing much opposition, the Tây Sơn army grew stronger. Nhạc had a desire to expand Tây Sơn's authority. He sent a large army led by his youngest brother Nguyễn Lữ to launch a sudden attack against Gia Định (now called Ho Chi Minh City) by sea. Lữ's raid was successful: he occupied Saigon and forced the Nguyễn Lord and his followers to flee to Biên Hòa. His success was short-lived, however, when an army loyal to the Nguyễn Lords and led by a man named Đỗ Thanh Nhơn rose against him in Đông Sơn. The loyalist army attacked and forced Tây Sơn's troops to withdraw from Saigon. Before withdrawing, Lữ seized the local foodstores and took them back to Quy Nhơn.

In 1776, Nguyễn Nhạc proclaimed himself King of Tây Sơn (Vietnamese: Tây Sơn Vương), choosing Đồ Bàn as his capital, renamed it Thành Hoàng Đế (Imperial City). He gave Huệ the title Phụ Chính (Vice National Administrator).

== Southern campaigns ==
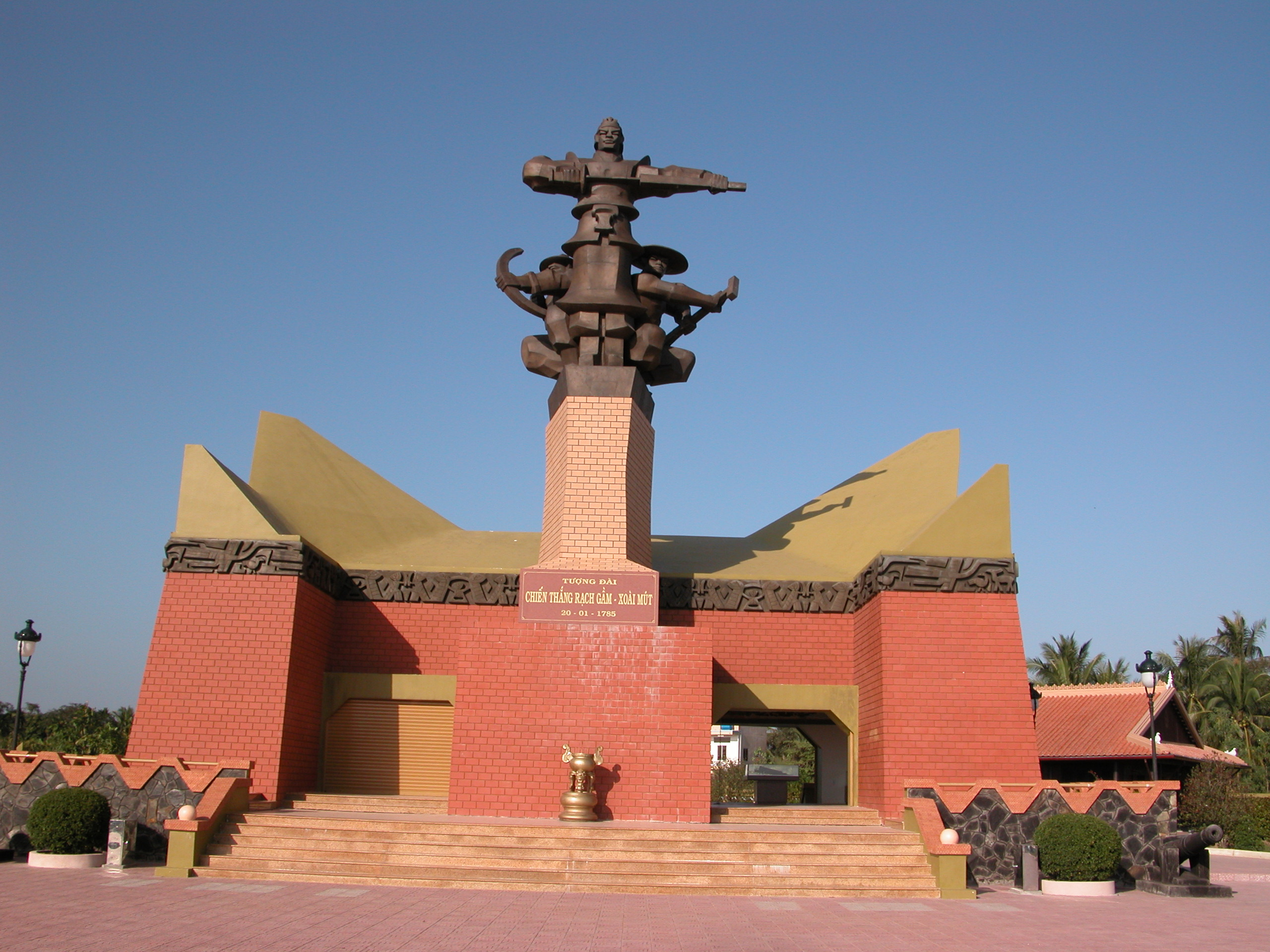
Vietnamese monument of the battle

In 1777, Nguyễn Huệ and Nguyễn Lữ led an army marched further south. They captured Saigon, destroyed Nguyễn lords' army successfully. Most members of Nguyễn royal family killed or executed in this campaign, except Nguyễn Ánh. Ánh fled to Rạch Giá then to Hà Tiên. Finally, Ánh fled to Pulo Panjang together with a French priest Pigneau de Behaine. After the battle, Huệ and Lữ returned to Quy Nhơn, only a small army was left in Gia Định. Nguyễn Ánh returned and occupied Gia Định in the next year. With the help of de Behaine, Ánh made Western weapons, recruited Western adventurers, proclaiming the restoration of Nguyễn lords' regime. In 1782, a Tây Sơn army under Nguyễn Nhạc and Nguyễn Huệ reoccupied Gia Định. Nguyễn Ánh had to flee to Phú Quốc.

In Phú Quốc, Nguyễn supporters suffered from Tây Sơn's frequent attacks and lacked food and drinking water. Châu Văn Tiếp was sent to Bangkok to request for aid. In 1783, Nguyễn Ánh and his supporters retreated to Siam with Siamese army. In Bangkok, Ánh was warmly welcomed by king Rama I. Rama I promised that Siamese would help Nguyễn Ánh to retake his lost kingdom.

The Siamese army moved towards southern Vietnam in 1784. A fleet with twenty thousand men under Chao Fa Krom Luang Thepharirak was dispatched to attack and recapture Saigon for Nguyễn Ánh. Ánh and his supporters were also allowed to accompany with the Siamese army. Phraya Wichinarong led Siamese infantry marched to Cambodia, and manoeuvred the Cambodian army. The Cambodian regent, Chaophraya Aphaiphubet (Baen), recruited five thousand soldiers to accompany with Siamese troops.

Siamese troops defeated Tây Sơn army and captured several places including Rạch Giá, Trấn Giang (Cần Thơ), Ba Thắc (Srok Pra-sak, Sóc Trăng), Trà Ôn, Sa Đéc, Mân Thít (or Mang thít, Man Thiết), and controlled Hà Tiên, An Giang and Vĩnh Long. However, they met a stubborn resistance from Tây Sơn army, and could not capture any important places. Unable to repulse the enemy, general Trương Văn Đa sent Đặng Văn Trấn to Quy Nhơn for help.

The Tây Sơn reinforcements led by Nguyễn Huệ (Note: Nguyễn Huệ was referred to as Ong Bai (องบาย) and Bak Bin Yuang (บากบินเยือง) in Siamese royal records; these two words derived from Vietnamese words Ông Bảy ("Sir seven") and Bắc Bình Vương respectively. Actually, Siamese confused him with his brother Nguyễn Lữ. Ông Bảy was Nguyễn Lữ's nick name.) reached Gia Định in 1785. Huệ sent an envoy to Siamese army under a banner of truce. Huệ showed fear deliberately, requested Siamese not to support Nguyễn Ánh. It proved that it was an excellent stratagem; Thepharirak was taken in. On the morning of 20 January 1785, Siamese fleet was surrounded in Rạch Gầm River and Xoài Mút River (near Mỹ Tho River, in present-day Tiền Giang Province). The battle ended with a near annihilation of the Siamese fleet, all the ships of the Siamese navy were destroyed. Thepharirak and Nguyễn Ánh fled back to Bangkok.

== Overthrow of Trịnh Lord ==
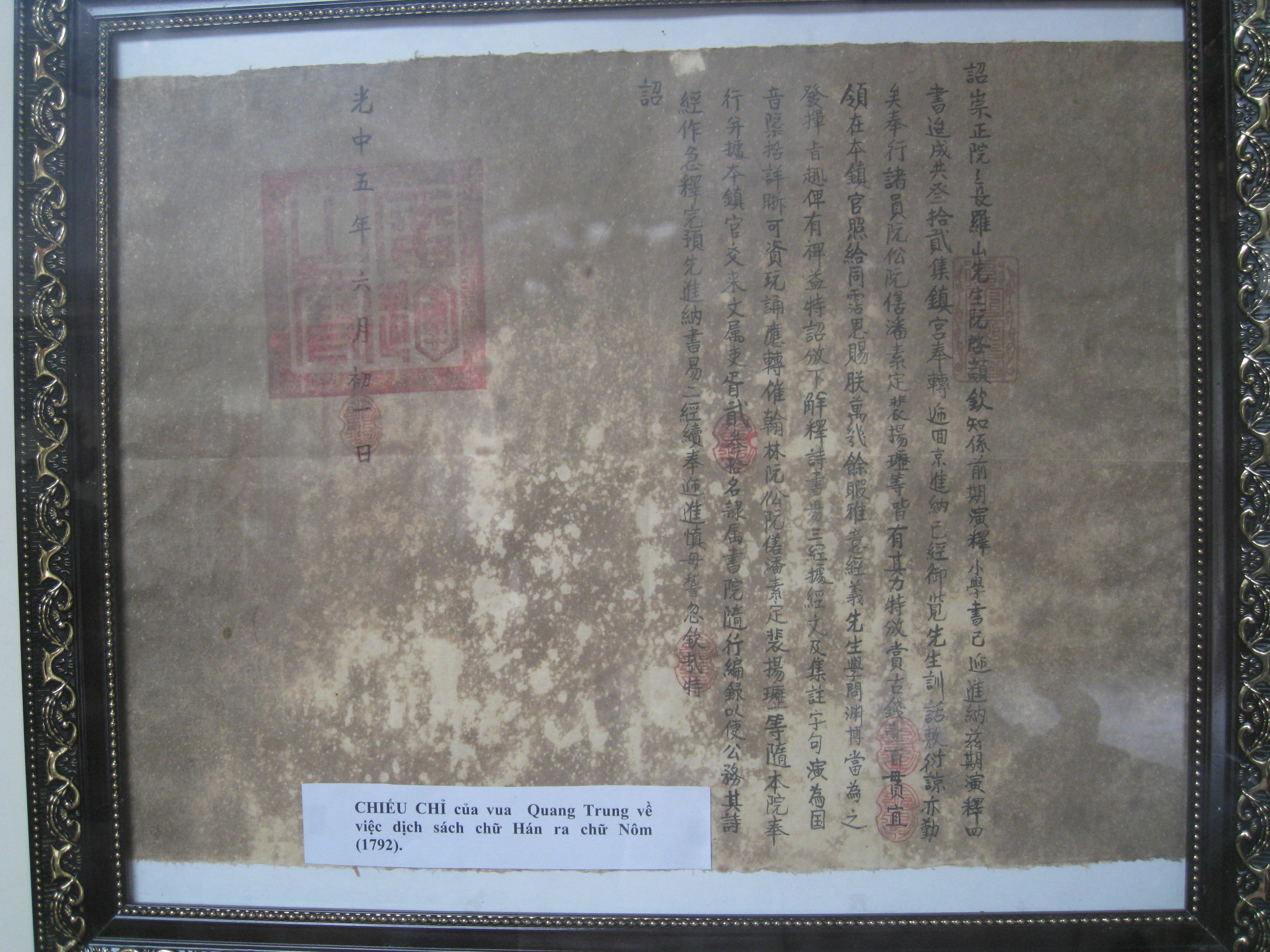
A royal edict of Quang Trung in 1790 on translating classical Chinese texts into Vietnamese script (chữ Nôm)

Northern Vietnam fell into chaos in 1786. An army under Nguyễn Huệ, Vũ Văn Nhậm and Nguyễn Hữu Chỉnh marched north to attack Phú Xuân. The governor of Phú Xuân, Phạm Ngô Cầu, was a venal and superstitious coward, he was at odds with his assistant, Hoàng Đình Thể. An itinerant Taoist priest came to Phú Xuân, and said to Cầu that he should set up an altar to pray for himself. Cầu was persuaded; he built an altar, ordered his soldiers to serve him day and night, making his soldiers very tired. Take this opportunity, Huệ launched a raid on Trịnh army. Hoàng Đình Thể was killed in action. Phạm Ngô Cầu surrendered to Tây Sơn army.

After the capture of Phú Xuân, Chỉnh encouraged Huệ to overthrow Trịnh lord. Huệ took his advice, marched further north without Nguyễn Nhạc's order. Tây Sơn army easily defeated several Trịnh troops. When they reached Thăng Long (modern Hanoi), Trịnh Khải came to the battlefield to fight against Tây Sơn army. Tây Sơn army attacked war elephants with arquebuses, finally, they captured Thăng Long (modern Hanoi) successfully. Huệ met Lê Hiển Tông in the next day; he said he marched north to overthrow of Trịnh lords, and did not have any other intentions. Huệ was warmly welcomed by Lê Hiển Tông, and received the position Nguyên-soái (元帥 "supreme commander") noble title Uy-quốc-công (威國公). He also married Lê Ngọc Hân, a daughter of the Lê Emperor. The old emperor died several days later. Lê Chiêu Thống was enthroned by Huệ. Although he had not been proclaimed as an Emperor at all, Nguyễn Huệ was respected by citizens of Thăng Long as the way an Emperor would be treated.

Nguyễn Nhạc did not want to take northern Vietnam; he sent an envoy to Phú Xuân to prevent Huệ from marching north, but Huệ had left. Then he got the message that Huệ had captured Thăng Long, and realized that Huệ was hard to be controlled. Nhạc led 2500 men and marched north to meet with Huệ and the Lê emperor. In Thăng Long, Nhạc promised that he would not take any territory of Lê emperor. Then Nhạc retreated from Thăng Long together with Huệ. Vũ Văn Nhậm disliked Nguyễn Hữu Chỉnh, and persuaded Huệ to leave Chỉnh in northern Vietnam. Huệ led his army back to Phú Xuân secretly. Chỉnh abandoned all his property, and came to Nghệ An to join Tây Sơn army. Nguyễn Nhạc did not have the heart to abandon him again; Chỉnh was left in Nghệ An together with a Tây Sơn general, Nguyễn Văn Duệ.

== Civil war between two brothers ==
In the same year, Nguyễn Nhạc proclaimed himself as Trung ương Hoàng đế (中央皇帝 "the Central Emperor"). Huệ received the title Bắc Bình Vương (北平王 "King of Northern Conquering"), the area north to Hải Vân was given as his fief. But not long after, he came into conflict with Nguyễn Nhạc. Nhạc attacked on Huệ at first, a civil war broke out.

But the military might of Huệ was stronger than Nhạc. Huệ besieged Quy Nhơn for several months. The main forces of Gia Định was called back to support Nhạc, but was defeated in Phú Yên, its commander Đặng Văn Chân surrendered to Huệ. Nhạc climbed onto the city wall, and shouted to Huệ: "How can you use the pot of skin to cook meat like that?" (Note: Original Vietnamese: "Nỡ lòng nào lại nồi da nấu thịt như thế?", Original Sino-Vietnamese: "Bì oa chử nhục, đệ tâm hà nhẫn?") It is an old custom, if hunters seized a prey in the jungle without a pot, they would flay it and use its skin to cook meat. Using this metaphor, Nhạc indicated that brothers should not fight with each other. Huệ was moved to tears, and decided to retreat. Taking the advice of Trần Văn Kỷ, Huệ decided to reach a peace agreement Nhạc. The two brothers chose Bến Bản as a boundary; the area north to Quảng Ngãi was Huệ's area; the area south to Thăng Bình and Điện Bàn belonged to Nhạc. From then on, they ceased fire with each other.

== Northern Campaign - Ending Le Dynasty ==
During Nguyễn Huệ's absence, northern Vietnam fell into chaos again. The regime of Trịnh lord restored. Lê Chiêu Thống could not control the situation, he asked for assistance from Nguyễn Hữu Chỉnh. Though Trịnh Bồng was banished from Thăng Long, Chỉnh became the new regent just like Trịnh lords before. After learning about actions of Chỉnh, an army under Vũ Văn Nhậm was sent by Huệ to attack Thăng Long. Chỉnh was swiftly defeated and fled together with Lê Chiêu Thống.

Chỉnh was found and executed, but Nhậm could not find Lê Chiêu Thống. In order to gain popularity among Northern Vietnamese, Nhậm installed Lê Duy Cận as giám quốc ("Prince Regent"). Two generals, Ngô Văn Sở and Phan Văn Lân, reported it to Huệ. Huệ led an army marched north, and launched a night raid. Sở and Lân opened the gate to let them in. Huệ captured Nhậm and had him executed.

Huệ led his army back to Phú Xuân. Lê Duy Cận remained in his position; Ngô Văn Sở, Phan Văn Lân, Nguyễn Văn Tuyết, Nguyễn Văn Dụng, Trần Thuận Ngôn and Ngô Thì Nhậm, were left in Thăng Long to watch Cận.

== War with Qing dynasty ==
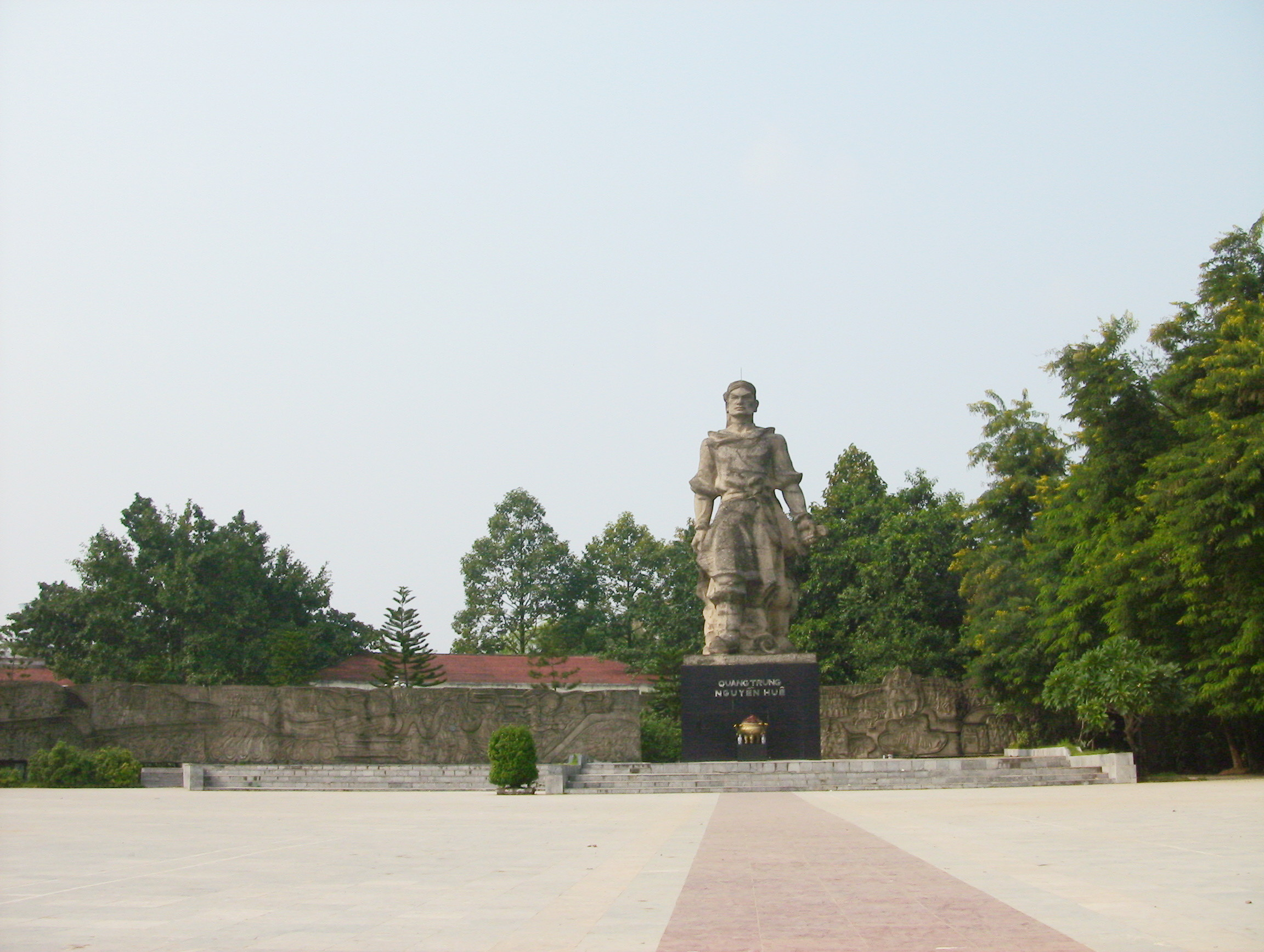
Statue of Quang Trung at Đống Đa Mound

Lê Chiêu Thống never abandoned his attempt to regain the throne. He hid in Bảo Lộc Mountain; in there, he had a plan to fight against Tây Sơn. His mother, Empress Dowager Mẫn, fled to Longzhou, called for help from Qing China in order to restore Lê dynasty. The Qianlong Emperor of Qing China decided to restore Lê Chiêu Thống to the throne, though under Qing protection.

Two Chinese armies invaded Vietnam in October of the lunar year Mậu Thân (November, 1788): Liangguang army under Sun Shiyi and Xu Shiheng, as the main force, marched across the South Suppressing Pass (present day Friendship Pass); Yungui army under Wu Dajing, marched across the Horse Pass (Maguan); the two armies aimed to attack Thăng Long directly.

When Liangguang army reached Lạng Sơn, Sun announced that there was a very large number of Qing army, in order to threaten Tây Sơn soldiers. Chinese marched south swiftly. Realizing Tây Sơn army could not stop Chinese army from marching to Thăng Long, Ngô Văn Sở accepted Ngô Thì Nhậm's idea, abandoned Thăng Long and retreated to Tam Điệp orderly. In Tam Điệp, Ngô Văn Sở sent Nguyễn Văn Tuyết to Phú Xuân to ask for aid.

Nguyễn Huệ knew the situation on Lunar 24 November (21 December 1788), cursing the invaders. Huệ declared that Lê Chiêu Thống was a national traitor and not qualified for the throne. In the next day, Nguyễn Huệ erected an altar on a hill south of Phú Xuân and proclaimed himself Emperor Quang Trung, in effect abolishing the Lê dynasty. After the coronation, he marched north with 60,000 soldiers. He recruited volunteers in Nghệ An Province, now the number of his soldiers reached 100,000. In Thọ Hạc (Thanh Hóa), he made an invigorating speech before his soldiers. Soldiers replied a great shout of approval. They were encouraged, and marched quickly.

Huệ arrived in Tam Điệp on Lunar 20 December (15 January 1789). In there, Huệ gathered together the whole forces, and divided them into five branches: main force led by Huệ, marched north to attack Thăng Long directly; a navy led by Nguyễn Văn Tuyết (Commander Tuyết), sailed from Lục Đầu River to attack Lê supporters in Hải Dương; another navy led by Nguyễn Văn Lộc (Commander Lộc), sailed from Lục Đầu River to attack Phượng Nhãn and Lạng Giang; a cavalry (including war elephants) led by Đặng Tiến Đông, marched to attack Cen Yidong in Đống Đa; another cavalry (including war elephants) led by Nguyễn Tăng Long (Commander Long) marched past Sơn Tây to attack Xu Shiheng in Ngọc Hồi (a place near Thanh Trì).

Meanwhile, Chinese soldiers were preparing to celebrate the Chinese New Year festival, and planned to march further south to capture Phú Xuân on 6 January of the next lunar year (31 January 1789). As Vietnamese New Year (Tết) was generally celebrated on the same day, Chinese generals assumed that Tây Sơn army would not attack in these days. However, subsequent events proved that they were wrong.

Nguyễn Huệ made a surprise and fast attack against Chinese forces during the New Year holiday. They reached Thăng Long in the night of 3 January of the next lunar year (28 January 1789). In the fierce 4-day battle, most of Chinese soldiers were unprepared, they were disastrously defeated by the Tây Sơn army in Ngọc Hồi and Đống Đa (part of modern Hanoi). Qing generals Xu Shiheng, Shang Weisheng, Zhang Chaolong and Cen Yidong were killed in action. Many Chinese soldiers and porters were killed in action, or drowned while crossing the Red River. According to Draft History of Qing, over half number of Chinese soldiers died in the battle. Sun Shiyi, the commander-in-chief of Chinese army, abandoned his army, fled for his life back to China with several soldiers. Lê Chiêu Tông also fled to China. Huệ marched into Thăng Long, his clothes were blackened by gunpowder. Tây Sơn army marched further north after the battle; they reached Lạng Sơn, and threatened to march across the border to arrest Lê Chiêu Thống.

After Nguyễn Huệ defeated the Later Lê dynasty, the last Lê emperor Lê Chiêu Thống and high ranking Lê loyalists fled Vietnam for asylum in Qing China and went to Beijing. Lê Chiêu Thống was appointed a Chinese mandarin of the fourth rank in the Han Yellow Bordered Banner, while lower ranking loyalists were sent to cultivate government land and join the Green Standard Army in Sichuan and Zhejiang. They adopted Qing clothing and adopt the queue hairstyle, effectively becoming naturalized subjects of the Qing dynasty affording them protection against Vietnamese demands for extradition. Some Lê loyalists were also sent to Central Asia in Urumqi. Modern descendants of the Lê monarch can be traced to southern Vietnam and Urumqi, Xinjiang.

== Reconciliation with Qing China ==
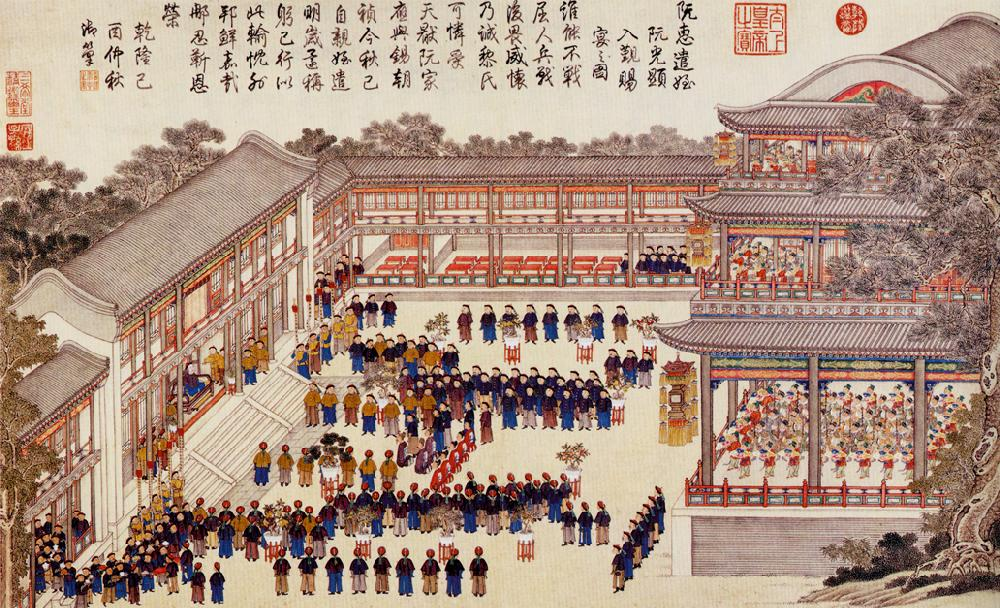
Late 18th-century painting depicting the Qianlong Emperor receiving Nguyễn Quang Hiển, the peace envoy from Nguyễn Huệ in Beijing.

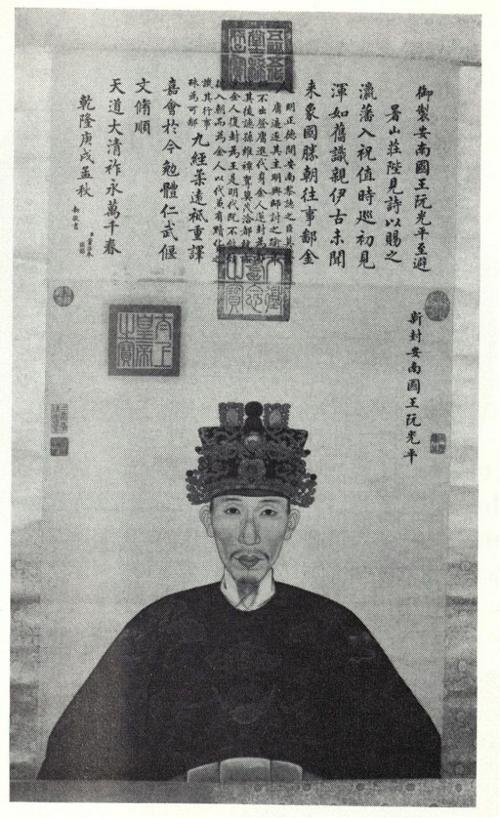
Qing portrait of Quang Trung.

The irate Qianlong Emperor of the Qing replaced Sun Shiyi with Fuk'anggan. Fuk'anggan did not want a conflict with Nguyễn Huệ and he sent a letter to Huệ in which he expressed that a necessary prerequisite for a cease-fire was an apology of Huệ to the emperor. Nguyễn Huệ sought to restore the tributary relationship in order to deter a joint Qing-Siam pincer attack and prevent further Chinese attempts to restore the Lê dynasty. Nguyễn Huệ sent a ritually submissive request to the Qianlong Emperor under the name of Nguyễn Quang Bình (also referred to as Ruan Guangping).

In 1789, the Qianlong Emperor agreed to re-establish the tributary relationship and enfeoff Nguyễn as the king of Annam on the condition that Nguyễn personally lead a special delegation to Beijing to celebrate the Qianlong Emperor's 80th birthday. For the Qianlong Emperor, the motivation for accepting the arrangement was to retain the Qing's supremacy and stabilize their southern border. Chinese and Vietnamese sources agreed that Nguyễn sent an imposter with a delegation to Beijing, where they were received with lavish imperial favors. The Qianlong Emperor approved the proposal and bestowed Nguyễn with the title An Nam quốc vương ("King of Annam"). The title indicated that Huệ was recognized as the legal ruler of Vietnam and Lê Chiêu Thống was no longer supported.

== Rule and reforms ==
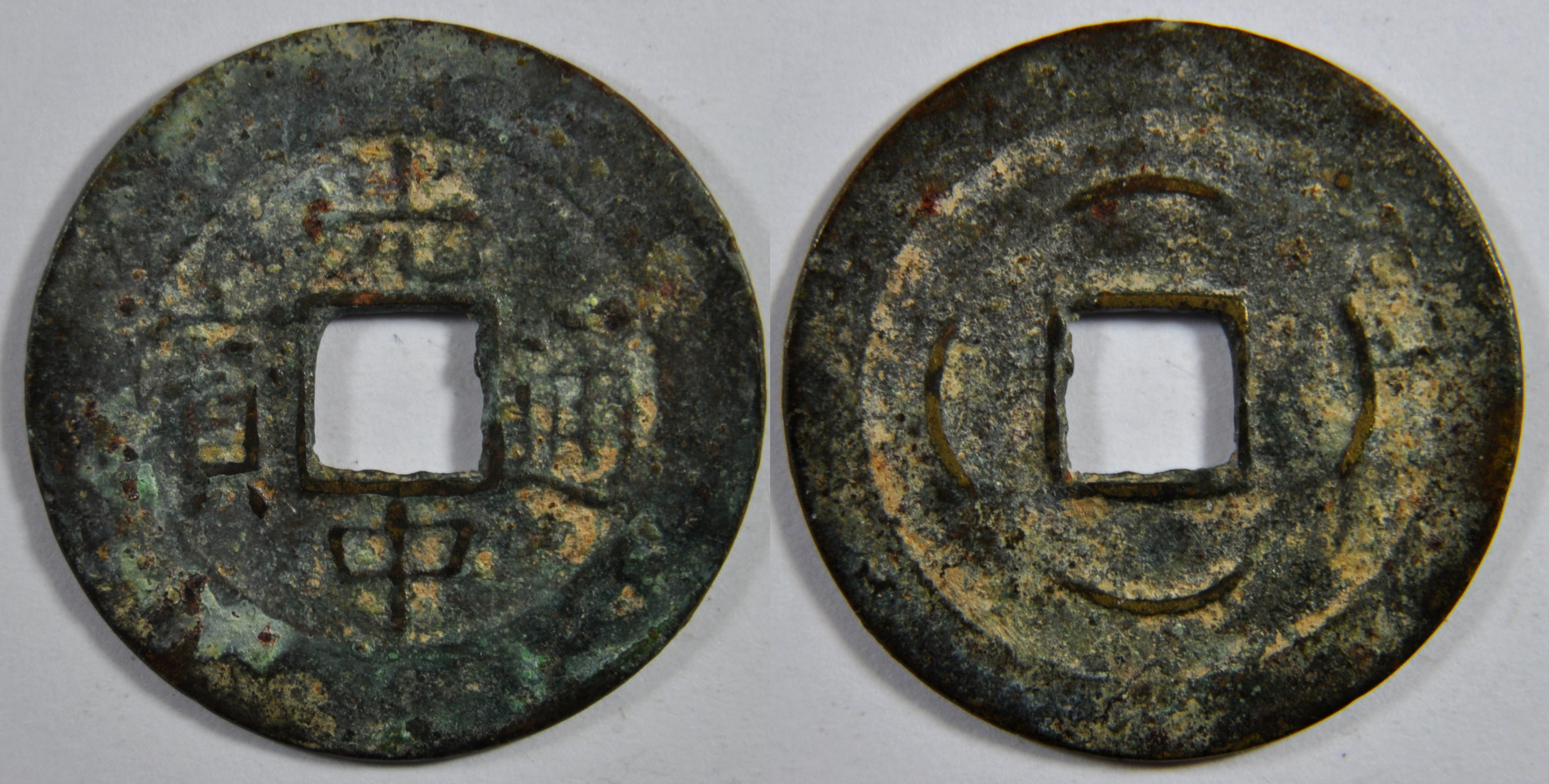
Quang Trung thông bảo (光中通寶), A coin issued during the reign of Emperor Quang Trung

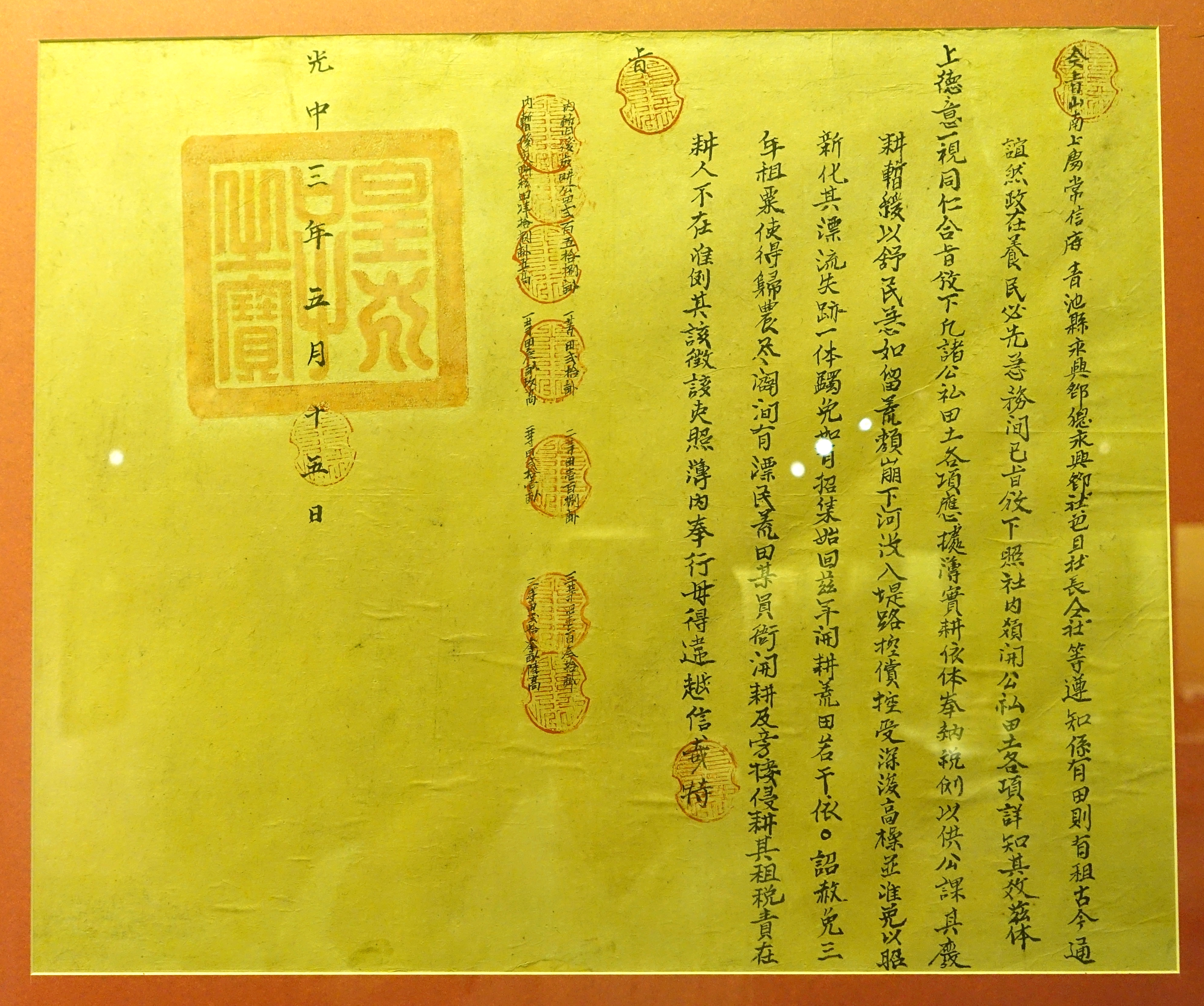
Royal order concerning tax exemption.

Once in power, Emperor Quang Trung first began instituting massive and unprecedented national reforms in Vietnam.

Though Quang Trung entitled as "king of Annam" by Qing China, he always regarded himself as emperor of Đại Việt. He crowned Lê Ngọc Hân empress, and granted her the noble title Bắc Cung hoàng hậu (北宮皇后 "empress of Northern Palace"); Nguyễn Quang Toản was designated as Crown Prince.

Taking the advice of Nguyễn Thiếp, Quang Trung decided to relocate the imperial capital in Nghệ An Province. He ordered Trần Quang Diệu to build a new citadel at the foot of Kỳ Lân Hill (modern Quyết Hill in Vinh). The new citadel was named Phượng Hoàng Trung Đô (鳳凰中都).

Thăng Long was renamed Bắc Thành (北城). Sơn Nam (山南) split into two trấn ("town"): Sơn Nam Thượng (山南上 "Upper Sơn Nam") and Sơn Nam Hạ (山南下 "Lower Sơn Nam"). Each trấn had two high officials: Trấn-thủ (鎮守 "viceroy") and Hiệp-trấn (協鎮 "deputy viceroy"). Each huyện ("district") had two officials: phân-tri (分知), the civil official, took charge of judicial litigation; phân-suất (分率), the military official, took charge of army provisions.

The official system of Tây Sơn dynasty was not mentioned in official records, but we could find several names of official positions in history records, such as tam công (三公), tam thiếu (三少), Đại-chủng-tể (大冢宰), Đại-tư-đồ (大司徒), Đại-tư-khấu (大司寇), Đại-tư-mã (大司馬), Đại-tư-không (大司空), Đại-tư-cối (大司會), Đại-tư-lệ (大司隸), Thái-úy (太尉), Đại-tổng-quản (大總管), Đại-đổng-lý (大董理), Đại-đô-đốc (大都督), Đại-đô-hộ (大都護), Trung-thư-sảnh (中書廳), Trung-thư-lệnh (中書令), Đại-học-sĩ (大學士), Hiệp-biện đại-học-sĩ (協辦大學士), Thị-trung ngự-sử (侍中御史), Lục-bộ thượng-thư (六部尚書), Tả-hữu đồng-nghị (左右同議), Tả-hữu phụng-nghị (左右奉議), Thị-lang (侍郎), Tư-vụ (司務), Hàn-lâm (翰林), etc.

The system of military units: a đạo (道) was composed of several cơ (奇), a cơ was composed of several đội (隊). Quang Trung organized the army into five major wings: tiền-quân ("army of the front"), hậu-quân ("army of the rear"), trung-quân ("army of the center"), tả-quân ("army of the left"), hữu-quân ("army of the right"). Tây Sơn army was recruited by enforced conscription. Chose one in three adult males (đinh 丁), the chosen one should join the army.

Adult males of the whole country divided into three scales to pay taxes in corvée (sưu dịch) and capitation (thuế thân): vị cập cách (未及格), 2 to 17 years old; tráng hạng (壯項), 18 to 55 years old; lão hạng (老項); 56 to 60 years old; lão nhiêu (老饒), over 61 years old. Different scales had different tax collection standards.

Farmers had to pay a fixed amount of grain as tax. Publicly owned farmland divided into three scales: the first scale paid 150 bát (鉢, a unit of weight) per mẫu (a unit of area); the second scale, 80 bát per mẫu; the third scale, 50 bát per mẫu. Privately owned farmland also divided into three scales: the first scale, 40 bát per mẫu; the second scale, 30 bát per mẫu; the third scale, 20 bát per mẫu.

There were also two additional taxes of farmland: tiền thập-vật (錢什物) and tiền khoán-khố (錢券庫). Publicly owned farmland: paid 1 tiền (currency unit) per mẫu for thập-vật, 50 đồng per mẫu for khoán-khố; privately owned farmland: paid 1 tiền per mẫu for thập-vật, 30 đồng per mẫu for khoán-khố.

Quang Trung introduced the identity card system to govern the large population. A census was conducted during his reign. Every adult male was granted tín bài (信牌), a wooden card on which was his name, birthplace and fingerprints. If anyone did not have the wooden card, he would be arrested and imprisoned with hard labour.

Quang Trung also replaced the traditional Chinese script with the Vietnamese chữ Nôm as the official written language of the country. Examinees were ordered to write chữ Nôm in imperial examination. Though this policy was criticized at that time, modern scholars stated that it had progressive significance.

A religious reform was carried out during his reign. Many small Buddhist monasteries were closed and merged into larger ones. Monks had to pass an examination, otherwise, they would be ordered to return to secular life. Quang Trung also adopted a policy of religious tolerance. His religious toleration won him the support of the growing Christian community and his campaign of the common people against the traditional elites won him the admiration of the peasant majority.

Education was also promoted under Quang Trung, while land redistribution was carried out.

== Plans to invade China ==
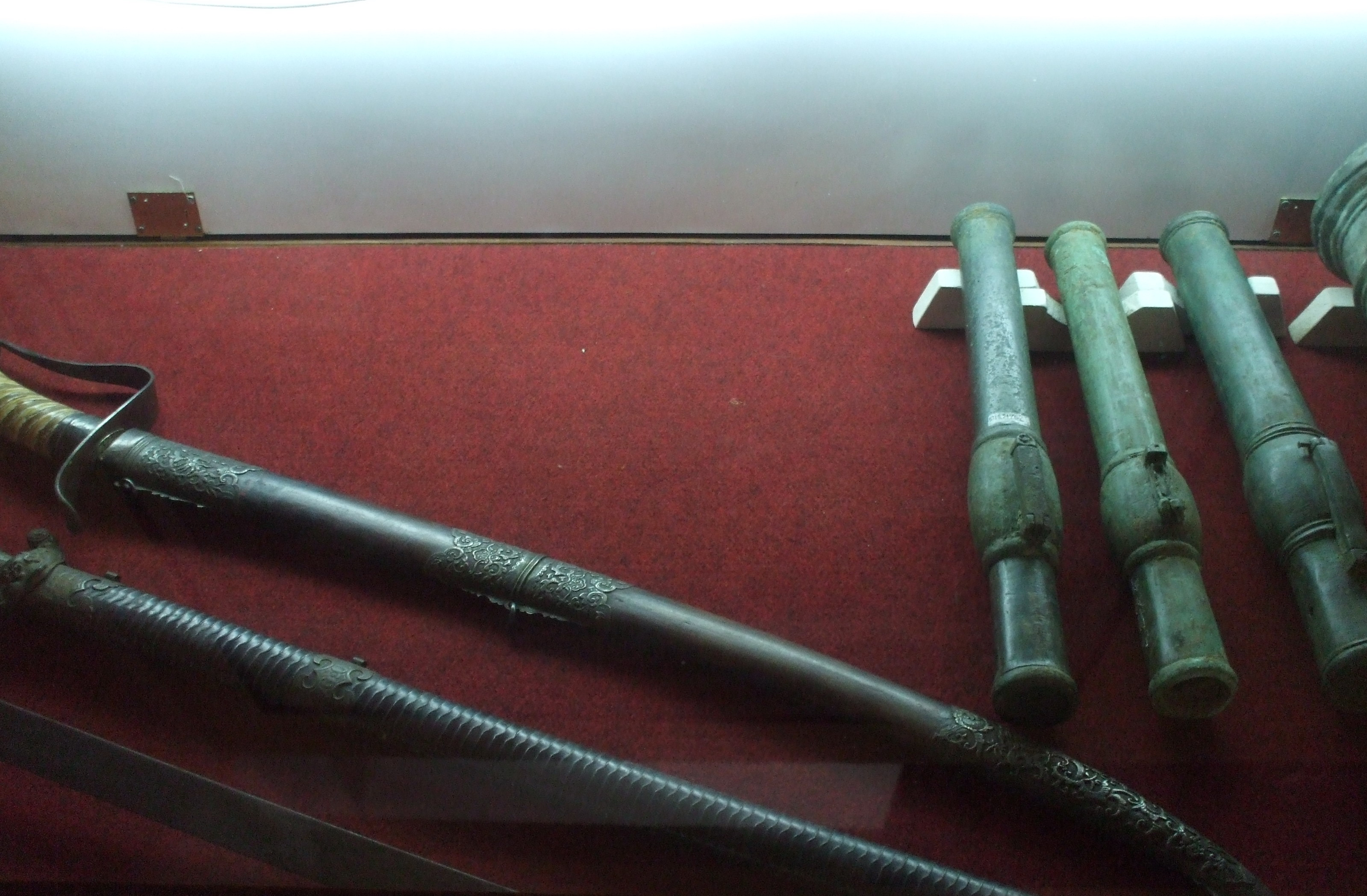
Weapons of Tây Sơn army

After the defeat of China, a Lê prince, Lê Duy Chỉ (黎維祗), fled to Tuyên Quang and Cao Bằng. There, Chỉ was supported by native chieftain Nùng Phúc Tấn (儂福縉) and Hoàng Văn Đồng (黃文桐). Chỉ devised a plan to unite Vientiane and Muang Phuan in a revolt of Tây Sơn dynasty. An army under Trần Quang Diệu conquered Muang Phuan and executed their chiefs. Then, the army invaded Kingdom of Vientiane; king Nanthasen fled, Tây Sơn marched west till the border of Siam. The victorious army attacked Bảo Lộc, captured Lê Duy Chỉ, Nùng Phúc Tấn, Hoàng Văn Đồng, and had them executed. Horses, elephants and war drums were brought to Vietnam as booty of war, then handed over to Qing China as tribute, Quang Trung did it to show power to China. Quang Trung also requested for exemption from customs duties, and established a yá háng (牙行, broker house in ancient China) in Nanning, they were both agreed by the Qianlong Emperor.

There was a territorial dispute near Sino-Vietnamese border. Vietnamese claimed this territory belonged to Tuyên Quang Province and Hưng Hóa Province, but was illegally occupied by native chiefdom of Guangxi in final years of Lê dynasty. Quang Trung wrote a letter to Fuk'anggan, required him to return this territory. Fuk'anggan rejected, and replied the border had been delimited. Quang Trung was resentful, from then on, he began to train his soldiers and build many large warships, planning to invade Liangguang. It was said that Quang Trung looked down upon the Qianlong Emperor. He said to his ministers that if given more time to train soldiers, he was not afraid to conflict with China.

Nguyễn Huệ was resentful, trained his army, built large warships and waited for an opportunity to take revenge on China. He also provided refuge to anti-Manchu organizations such as the Tiandihui and the White Lotus. Infamous Chinese pirates, such as Chen Tien-pao (陳添保), Mo Kuan-fu (莫觀扶), Liang Wen-keng (梁文庚), Fan Wen-tsai (樊文才), Cheng Chi (鄭七) and Cheng I (鄭一) were granted official positions and/or noble ranks under the Tây Sơn empire. With the support of Tây Sơn dynasty, the number of Chinese pirates grew rapidly, they were able to block sea routes, and harassed the coastlines of China. The attack on China never materialized by the time that Quang Trung died in 1792.

In 1792, Quang Trung decided to invade China. There was evidence that he had the intention to conquer South China. Quang Trung attempted to seek a Chinese princess in marriage, and demanded that Liangguang should be ceded to Vietnam as dowry. He knew the Qianlong Emperor would not accept his unreasonable demand; he just wanted an excuse of war. But finally, the messenger Võ Chiêu Viễn (武招遠) did not set out because Quang Trung fell ill.

== Final years ==
Quang Trung suddenly fell ill. The official records did not mention about what disease he got. Contemporary historians stated that his death was possibly due to a stroke. Legend had it that he died actually because he was punished by spirits of dead Nguyễn lords whose tombs he seriously insulted.

Quang Trung called Trần Quang Diệu back to Phú Xuân. He set a schedule to move the capital to Phượng Hoàng trung đô (present-day Vinh) together with high ministers. At this time, he got the information that Nguyễn Ánh had captured Bình Thuận, Bình Khang (modern Ninh Hòa) and Diên Khánh. He was depressed, and soon became critically ill. On his deathbed, Quang Trung was worried about the future of Tây Sơn dynasty. He described the Crown Prince Nguyễn Quang Toản as "a clever boy but too young", described Nguyễn Nhạc as "an old man who is resigned to the present state of affairs". His will instructed that he be buried within a month; all ministers and generals should be united as one to assist the Crown Prince; and move the capital to Phượng Hoàng trung đô as soon as possible. If not, one day all of them will be killed by Nguyễn Ánh.

Quang Trung was buried on the southern bank of Perfume River. He was buried secretly; Ngô Thì Nhậm stated that Quang Trung was buried in Đan Dương Palace (cung điện Đan Dương). The exact location was not clear; Nguyễn Đắc Xuân, a culture researcher, believed that it was located at Bình An Village, Huế.

Quang Trung received temple name Thái Tổ (太祖) and posthumous name Vũ Hoàng đế (武皇帝) from his successor, Nguyễn Quang Toản. Getting the information, Nguyễn Nhạc prepared to attend his funeral, however, the road was blocked by Toản. Nhạc had to return, and sent a sister to attend the funeral.

The plan to invade China was given up. Nguyễn Quang Toản built a fake tomb in Linh Đường (苓塘, a place in modern Thanh Trì District) for him. Then Toản reported his death to the Qianlong Emperor: "I followed my father's will, buried him in Linh Đường instead of his birthland because he was reluctant to leave your palace, and Linh Đường was nearer to your palace." The Qianlong Emperor praised Quang Trung, gave him the posthumous name Trung Thuần (忠純 lit. "loyalty and sincerity"). He also composed a funeral oration for Quang Trung. In the oration, the Qianlong Emperor wrote: "(You have) blessed (me) and pledged loyalty (to me) in the southernmost, (so I) approved you to attend (my) imperial court; (now you) lie at rest beside the West Lake, (you are) nostalgic for (the good old days in) my palace till death." (祝釐南極効忠特獎其趨朝 妥魄西湖沒世無忘於戀闕). The oration was engraved on a stone, and erected beside his fake tomb. A Chinese official was sent to Linh Đường to pay condolences, and granted Nguyễn Quang Toản the title An Nam quốc vương ("King of Annam").

== The fall of Tây Sơn dynasty ==
However, Nguyễn Quang Toản (now crowned the Emperor Cảnh Thịnh) did not continue his father's policies. The identity card system was abolished, and the capital remained in Phú Xuân. High ministers and generals struggled for power, which led to the decline of his empire.

Tây Sơn dynasty was overthrown by Nguyễn Ánh in 1802 after a ten years long war. Quang Trung's sons: Nguyễn Quang Toản, Nguyễn Quang Thùy, Nguyễn Quang Duy (阮光維), Nguyễn Quang Thiệu (阮光紹) and Nguyễn Quang Bàn (阮光盤), were captured alive. Nguyễn Quang Thùy committed suicide; the others were executed by having their bodies dismembered by having five elephants pull the limbs and head (五象分屍). The tombs of Nguyễn Nhạc and Nguyễn Huệ were razed to the ground, their remains were dug out and crushed into ashes. The skulls of Nguyễn Nhạc, Nguyễn Huệ and Huệ's wife, were locked up in prison in perpetuity. It was said that Nguyễn Huệ had desecrated the tombs of Nguyễn lords before, Nguyễn Ánh did that to "revenge for the ancestors".

Tây Sơn dynasty was regarded as an illegal regime during Nguyễn dynasty; it was mentioned as Nguỵ Tây (僞西 "False Tây"), or Tây tặc (西賊 "Bandit Tây") in Nguyễn official records to highlight the supposed illegitimacy of the dynasty.

== Legacy ==
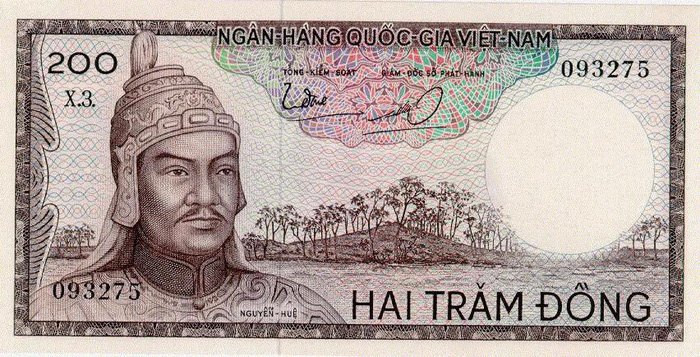
Nguyễn Huệ, as depicted on the South Vietnamese 200 đồng banknote.

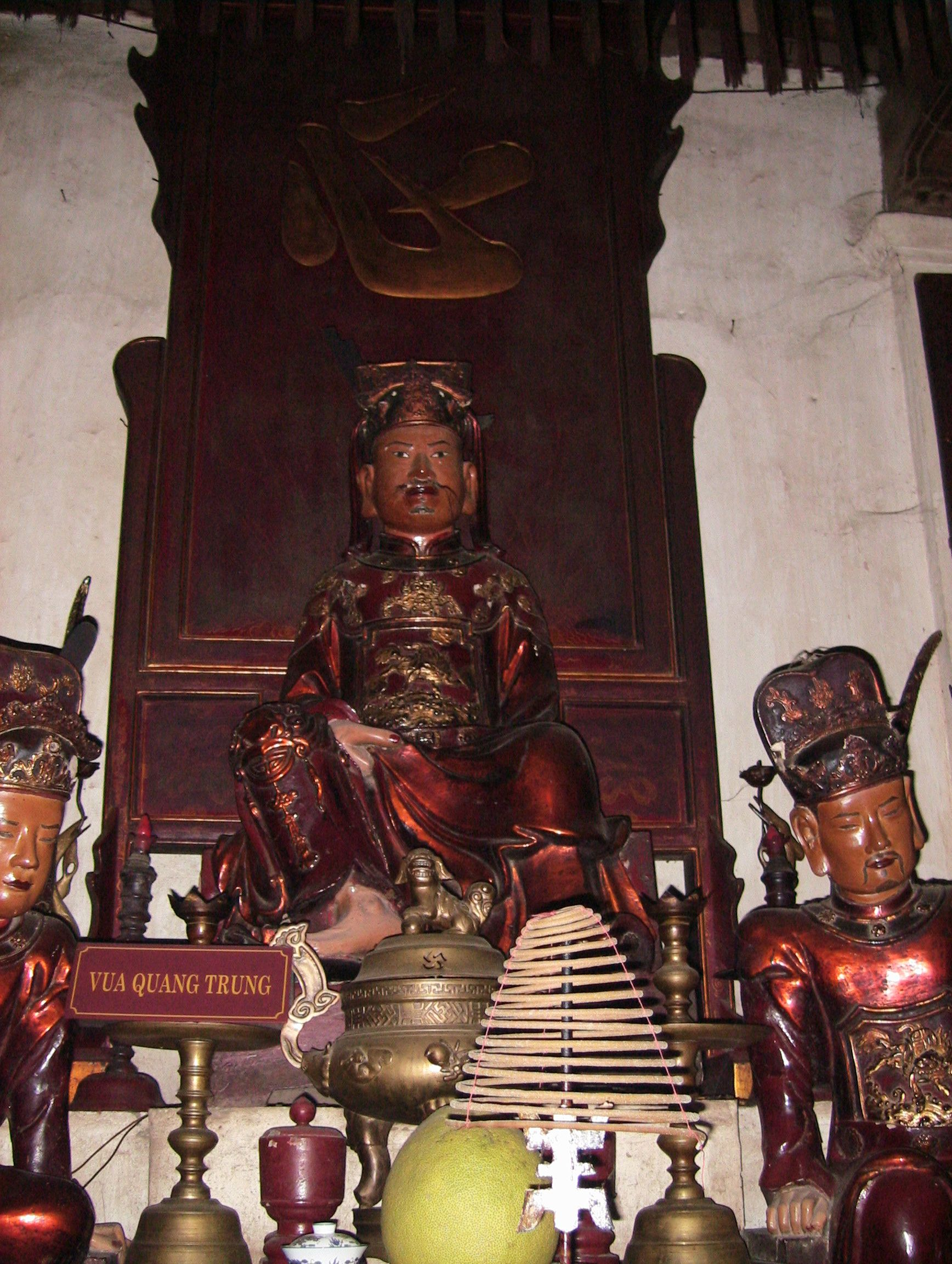
Emperor Quang Trung statue at Bộc Temple

Nguyễn Huệ was regarded as the national savior of Vietnam and one of the most popular figures in the country.

Nguyễn Huệ was deified in Vietnamese culture, Bộc Temple (Chùa Bộc) in Hanoi was a temple to him.

Nguyễn Huệ was depicted on the South Vietnamese 200 đồng banknote.

Most cities in Vietnam, regardless of the political orientation of the government, have named major streets after him.

In his hometown, Quang Trung Museum has been built to showcase valuable historical documents and artifacts from the Tay Son dynasty.

Tây Sơn hào kiệt, a Vietnamese film, was based on his story.

On 6 February 2018 the Vietnam People's Navy commissioned the Quang Trung a Gepard-class frigate currently in service with the 4th Regional Command.

== See also ==
- Tây Sơn military tactics and organization

== Notes ==
Quang Trung Tây Sơn dynasty Born: 1753 Died: 1792
Regnal titles
Preceded by Thái Đức	Emperor of Đại Việt; 1788–1792	Succeeded by Cảnh Thịnh
