= Nguyễn Lữ =

18th-century Vietnamese military leader and royal of the Tây Sơn dynasty

- Đông Định vương
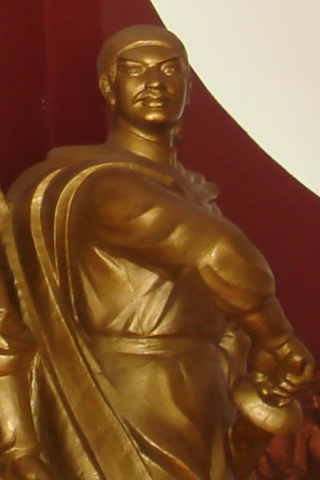
- Reign: 1786–1787
- Born: ? Bình Định, Đàng Trong, Đại Việt
- Died: 1787; Quy Nhơn, Đại Việt
Names
- Nguyễn Lữ (阮侶); Nguyễn Văn Lữ (阮文呂)
- House: Tây Sơn dynasty
- Father: Hồ Phi Phúc (or Nguyễn Phi Phúc)

Nguyễn Lữ (chữ Hán: 阮侶; died 1787), also known by the title of Đông Định vương (東定王, "king of Eastern Conquering" (Note: Nguyễn Lữ was referred to as Ong Tinh Wuang (Thai: องติเวือง) in Siamese records; Ong Tinh Wuang derived from the Vietnamese word Ông Định vương ("Sir Định vương").)), was one of the Tây Sơn brothers who formed short-lived Tây Sơn dynasty of Vietnam.

== Biography ==
Lữ had two brothers: Emperor Thái Đức, common name Nguyễn Nhạc; and Emperor Quang Trung, common name Nguyễn Huệ. According to Đại Nam chính biên liệt truyện, the three brothers, listed from eldest to youngest, were Nguyễn Nhạc, Nguyễn Lữ, Nguyễn Huệ; However, other source reported that he was the youngest one among Tây Sơn brothers. He had two nicknames: thầy Tư Lữ (Fourth Master Lữ ) and Đức ông Bảy (Virtuous Sir Seven).

After defeating the Nguyễn Lords and seizing Saigon in 1783 Nguyễn Lữ became king of the South, while Nguyễn Nhạc was crowned king of central Vietnam. Two generals, Đặng Văn Chân and Phạm Văn Tham, were left in Gia Định to assist him.

A civil war broke out between Nguyễn Nhạc and Nguyễn Huệ in 1787, the main forces withdrew from Gia Định, and marched north to support Nhạc. Getting the information, Nguyễn Ánh returned to Vietnam. Nguyễn Lữ was afraid, and retreated to Biên Hòa, leaving Phạm Văn Tham to defend Saigon. Ánh forged a letter from Nhạc to Lữ, and sent it to Tham. In the letter, Nhạc described Tham as an overbearing man, and ordered Lữ to kill Tham. After receiving the letter, Tham marched to Biên Hòa, with a white flag in front of the army, to justify his wrongful treatment. But the white flag was mistaken for Tham's surrender to Nguyễn lord, Nguyễn Lữ abandoned his troops and his fief, fled to Quy Nhơn and sought refuge with his elder brother Nguyễn Nhạc. Not long after he died there.

== See also ==
- Nguyễn Nhạc
- Nguyễn Huệ
